= 2020 Northwoods League season =

27th annual season of the Northwoods League

- League: Northwoods League
- Sport: Baseball
- Duration: June 15 – September 2 (Playoffs: Sept. 2 – Sept. 5)
- Games: ~490
- Teams: 22

Seasons
- ← 2019 2021 →

The 2020 Northwoods League season was the 27th season of baseball in the Northwoods League, a collegiate summer baseball organization. The season was marked by significant alterations due to the Covid-19 pandemic.

== Season overview ==
=== Background ===
The pandemic brought many baseball organizations to a halt, including a delay to the start of the MLB season and a complete cancellation of the minor league baseball season. Collegiate summer baseball was played, in altered form, by various teams and leagues.

The Northwoods League (NWL) was able to operate, albeit in limited fashion. For a variety of reasons, six teams (the Kokomo Jackrabbits, Madison Mallards, Lakeshore Chinooks, Eau Claire Express, Duluth Huskies, and Thunder Bay Border Cats) were unable to participate.

The NWL responded by forming seven hyper-regional pod divisions. While some of these divisions were relatively typical, others were filled out by six temporary teams that were created by existing NWL franchises. All temporary teams shared a stadium with their existing counterpart and all lasted only one season.

=== Temporary teams ===
- The K-Town Bobbers were created by the Kenosha Kingfish and the two played each other in the Kenosha Division.
- The Great Lakes Resorters and Northern Michigan Dune Bears were created by the Traverse City Pit Spitters and the three teams competed in the Michigan North Division. The Dune Bears only ended up playing two games.
- The Kalamazoo Mac Daddies were created by the Kalamazoo Growlers. The two Kalamazoo teams (as well as the Battle Creek Bombers) competed in the Michigan South Division.
- The Mandan Flickertails and Bismarck Bull Moose were created by the Bismarck Larks and competed in the North Dakota Division.

=== Season ===
The first game of the season was on June 15, with the Flickertails squaring off against the Larks. The North Dakota pod was the only NWL action until July 1, when several other divisions began their seasons. While the NWL season typically wraps up in early to mid August, several teams continued beyond that date and held divisional playoffs at various times.

The two Michigan-based divisions ended their regular season on September 2 and began their playoffs immediately afterward. The North Dakota Divsion began their playoffs on September 2. The last game of the season was held on September 5, with the Mac Daddies defeating the Pit Spitters for the Michigan championship.

=== Individual achievements ===
Jayson Newman appeared in 29 games for the Willmar Stingers, batting .405 with five home runs, nine doubles and one triple. Peyton Williams appeared in 33 games for the Waterloo Bucks, leading the league with 13 home runs, as well as batting. 304 with 36 RBI and 26 runs scored.

Spencer Arrighetti pitched 24 innings for the Wisconsin Rapids Rafters across seven games. He maintained a perfect 0.00 ERA, with 37 strikeouts and only 10 walks.

Spencer Schwellenbach appeared in 22 games with the Traverse City Pit Spitters, playing outfield and batting .356 (.911 OPS) with 31 hits and 12 stolen bases. After his junior year at Nebraska, where he began pitching and playing as a two-way player, he was drafted by the Atlanta Braves in the second round of the 2021 MLB Draft and developed into a successful MLB pitcher.

In the 5-round 2020 Major League Baseball draft, an even 20 former NWL players were selected by MLB teams. Garrett Mitchell was the highest-selected alum, going to the Milwaukee Brewers with the 20th pick. Mitchell had played with the Mankato MoonDogs in 2018, after his freshman season at UCLA.

== Standings ==
Kenosha Division
Pos	Team	G	W	L	Pct.
1	Kenosha Kingfish	26	17	9	.654
2	K-Town Bobbers	26	9	17	.346

Michigan North Division
Pos	Team	G	W	L	Pct.
1	Traverse City Pit Spitters	41	33	8	.805
2	Northern Michigan Dune Bears	2	1	1	.500
3	Great Lakes Resorters	42	8	34	.190

Michigan South Division
Pos	Team	G	W	L	Pct.
1	Kalamazoo Growlers	65	40	25	.615
2	Kalamazoo Mac Daddies	72	32	40	.444
3	Battle Creek Bombers	70	31	39	.443

Minnesota-Iowa Division
Pos	Team	G	W	L	Pct.
1	Waterloo Bucks	41	28	13	.683
2	St. Cloud Rox	40	27	13	.675
3	Willmar Stingers	42	22	20	.524
4	Mankato MoonDogs	42	17	25	.405
5	Rochester Honkers	37	7	30	.189

North Dakota Division
Pos	Team	G	W	L	Pct.
1	Bismarck Larks	48	33	15	.688
2	Mandan Flickertails	48	24	24	.500
3	Bismarck Bull Moose	47	14	33	.298

Wisconsin-Illinois East Division
Pos	Team	G	W	L	Pct.
1	Fond du Lac Dock Spiders	48	31	17	.646
2	Green Bay Booyah	46	18	28	.391
3	Rockford Rivets	43	16	27	.372

Wisconsin-Illinois West Division
Pos	Team	G	W	L	Pct.
1	Wisconsin Rapids Rafters	46	35	11	.761
2	La Crosse Loggers	48	23	25	.479
3	Wisconsin Woodchucks	47	16	31	.340

== Playoffs ==
Some divisions/teams opted to compete in short playoff series to determine playoff pod champions. The North Dakota pod was exclusive to the North Dakota Division, with the Larks and Flickertails engaging in a best-of-three series.

The Michigan pod series consisted of two teams each from the North (Traverse City) and South (Kalamazoo) competing in a best-of-three semifinal before culminating in a one-game championship hosted by the Pit Spitters.

The Wisconsin-Illinois pod consisted of two teams each from the East (Fond du Lac and Green Bay) and West (Wisconsin Rapids and La Crosse) competing in a best-of-three semifinal before culminating in a one-game championship hosted by the Dock Spiders.

The champions and runners-up are as follows:

Playoff Pod	Champion	Runner-up
North Dakota	Bismarck Larks	Mandan Flickertails
Michigan	Kalamazoo Mac Daddies	Traverse City Pit Spitters
Wisconsin-Illinois	Fond du Lac Dock Spiders	La Crosse Loggers

== Statistical leaders ==
For cumulative stats, leaders include all league players. For rate stats, leaders include only qualifiers. Qualified hitters must have 2.70 plate appearances per team game. Per NWL standards, qualified pitchers must have minimum .80 innings pitched per team game. This significantly limits the pool of those qualifying for pitching rate stats.

Note: 2020 rate stats exclude players from the Northern Michigan Dune Bears. Even if they meet technical qualifying standards, the Dune Bears only played two games.

=== Hitting ===
Stat	Player	Team	Total
H	Jalen Smith	Bucks	53
HR	Peyton Williams	Bucks	13
RBI	Andy Garriola	Rafters	48
AVG	Jayson Newman	Stingers	.405
OPS	Jayson Newman	Stingers	1.128
SB	Braiden Ward	Dune Bears, Loggers	34

=== Pitching ===
Stat	Player	Team	Total
ERA	Adam Wheaton	Growlers	0.60
W	Adam Wheaton	Growlers	7
SO	Nate Madej	Woodchucks	52
SV	Trey Nordmann	Growlers	8

== All-Star selections ==
The mid-season All-Star Game was cancelled due to the pandemic, but after the season concluded, the league announced its Post-Season All-Stars for the full regular season.

Hitters
Position	Player	Team
C	Chase Adkison	Larks
C	Chase Stanke	Stingers
C	Ryan Hampe	Rivets
1B	Tim Elko	Dock Spiders
1B	Peyton Williams	Bucks
2B	Jalen Smith	Bucks
2B	Sam Novitske	Dock Spiders
3B	Parker Noland	Dock Spiders
3B	Jordan Barth	Rox
SS	Robert Moore	Honkers
SS	Spencer Schwellenbach	Pit Spitters
INF	Kobe Kato	Loggers
INF	Mitch Bubban	Kingfish
OF	Wyatt Ulrich	Larks
OF	John Rhodes	Dock Spiders
OF	Zach Gilles	MoonDogs
OF	Andy Garriola	Rafters
OF	Oraj Anu	Bucks
OF	Nadir Lewis	Booyah
OF	Kyle Hess	Woodchucks
OF	Callen Schwabe	Bull Moose
OF	Christian Garcia	Resorters
DH	Justice Bigbie	Bobbers
DH	Jayson Newman	Stingers
DH	Xane Washington	Bucks

Pitchers
Position	Player	Team
P	Spencer Arrighetti	Rafters
P	Glen Albanese	Rafters
P	Chris McElvain	Rafters
P	Travis Adams	Rafters
P	Nate Madej	Woodchucks
P	Adam Wheaton	Growlers
P	Chad Patrick	Pit Spitters
P	John Bezdicek	Stingers
P	Larson Kindreich	Honkers
P	Shane Barringer	MoonDogs
P	Christian Grigsby	Bombers
P	Drew Irvine	Dock Spiders
P	John Wilson	Flickertails
P	Dane Armbrustmacher	Mac Daddies

== NWL alumni in MLB ==
=== MLB players who played in the NWL in 2020 ===
The following is a list of players who appeared in the NWL during the 2020 season, en route to a future appearance/career in MLB.

Name	2020 NWL team	MLB debut	MLB debut team
Gavin Stone	Great Lakes Resorters	5/3/2023	Los Angeles Dodgers
Grant Hartwig	Battle Creek Bombers	6/19/2023	New York Mets
Jordan Wicks	Rockford Rivets	8/26/2023	Chicago Cubs
Graham Pauley	La Crosse Loggers	3/20/2024	San Diego Padres
Victor Scott II	Fond du Lac Dock Spiders	3/28/2024	St. Louis Cardinals
Spencer Arrighetti	Wisconsin Rapids Rafters	4/10/2024	Houston Astros
Brett Harris	K-Town Bobbers	5/3/2024	Oakland Athletics
Kyle Manzardo	Willmar Stingers	5/6/2024	Cleveland Guardians
Spencer Schwellenbach	Traverse City Pit Spitters	5/29/2024	Atlanta Braves
Ryan Loutos	Fond du Lac Dock Spiders	6/1/2024	St. Louis Cardinals
Blake Dunn	Kalamazoo Growlers	6/4/2024	Cincinnati Reds
Brooks Lee	Willmar Stingers	7/3/2024	Minnesota Twins
Seth Halvorsen	Great Lakes Resorters	8/30/2024	Colorado Rockies
Billy Cook	Wisconsin Rapids Rafters	9/8/2024	Pittsburgh Pirates
Drake Baldwin	K-Town Bobbers	3/27/2025	Atlanta Braves
Chad Patrick	Traverse City Pit Spitters	3/29/2025	Milwaukee Brewers
Logan VanWey	La Crosse Loggers	4/11/2025	Houston Astros
Caleb Durbin	Fond du Lac Dock Spiders	4/18/2025	Milwaukee Brewers
Ryan Bergert	Fond du Lac Dock Spiders	4/26/2025	San Diego Padres
Noah Cameron	Willmar Stingers	4/30/2025	Kansas City Royals
Tim Elko	Fond du Lac Dock Spiders	5/10/2025	Chicago White Sox
Andrew Hoffman	Traverse City Pit Spitters	5/30/2025	Kansas City Royals
Jack Winkler	St. Cloud Rox	5/31/2025	Miami Marlins
Ryan Ritter	Fond du Lac Dock Spiders	6/6/2025	Colorado Rockies
Kyle Teel	Wisconsin Rapids Rafters	6/6/2025	Chicago White Sox
Andre Granillo	Mankato MoonDogs	6/12/2025	St. Louis Cardinals
Carson Seymour	Rockford Rivets	6/29/2025	San Francisco Giants
Travis Adams	Wisconsin Rapids Rafters	7/5/2025	Minnesota Twins
Jakob Marsee	Great Lakes Resorters	8/1/2025	Miami Marlins
Bob Seymour	Rockford Rivets	8/15/2025	Tampa Bay Rays
Duncan Davitt	Waterloo Bucks	4/10/2026	Chicago White Sox
Tommy Troy	Traverse City Pit Spitters	5/24/2026	Arizona Diamondbacks
Gabriel Hughes	Great Lakes Resorters	7/3/2026	Colorado Rockies
Luke Murphy	Battle Creek Bombers	7/31/2026	Los Angeles Angels
Andrew Pinckney	St. Cloud Rox	8/5/2026	Washington Nationals

=== Alums with 2020 MLB debuts ===
The following is a list of NWL alums who made their Major League Baseball debuts in the 2020 MLB season.

Name	MLB debut	Debut team	Former NWL team(s)	Season(s) in NWL
Joe McCarthy	7/23	Giants	Mallards	2013
J.P. Feyereisen	7/24	Brewers	Rafters	2012-13
Caleb Baragar	7/25	Giants	Growlers	2014
Alex Vesia	7/25	Miami Marlins	MoonDogs	2016
Brooks Kriske	7/29	Yankees	Loggers	2013
Daulton Varsho	7/30	Diamondbacks	Express	2015-16
Joey Gerber	8/04	Mariners	MoonDogs	2017
Sterling Sharp	8/05	Marlins	Mallards	2014-15
Nick Mears	8/08	Pirates	Stingers	2017-18
Dakota Bacus	8/14	Nationals	Bucks	2011
Dane Dunning	8/19	White Sox	Bucks	2014
Will Craig	8/27	Pirates	Rox	2014
Justin Topa	9/1	Brewers	Mallards	2012
Kyle Nelson	9/10	Indians	Loggers	2015
Zach McKinstry	9/16	Dodgers	Bucks	2015
Jared Oliva	9/21	Pirates	Woodchucks	2015-16

=== Alumni in MLB highlights ===
In 2020, there was no MLB All-Star Game nor some usual awards such as Gold Glove or Silver Slugger.

The Los Angeles Dodgers won the 2020 World Series, and several NWL alums were either on the active roster or on the 2020 "Taxi Squad," referring to players who trained at the Dodgers' alternate training site (USC) in lieu of affiliated minor league baseball. The following players met this criterion for the 2020 Dodgers.

Active roster:

- Austin Barnes (St. Cloud Rox, 2010)
- Matt Beaty (Alexandria Beetles, 2012; Green Bay Bullfrogs, 2014)
- Tony Gonsolin (Madison Mallards, 2015)

Taxi squad:

- Scott Alexander (La Crosse Loggers, 2008)
- Rocky Gale (Green Bay Bullfrogs, 2008)
- Zach McKinstry (Waterloo Bucks, 2015)

== See also ==
- 2020 Major League Baseball season
- Impact of the COVID-19 pandemic on baseball
