= 2023 Northwoods League season =

30th annual season of the Northwoods League

- League: Northwoods League
- Sport: Baseball
- Duration: May 29 – August 12 (Baseball playoffs: August 13 – August 18)
- Games: ~825
- Teams: 24

Northwoods League Championship
- Champions: Green Bay Rockers
- Runners-up: St. Cloud Rox

Seasons
- ← 2022 2024 →

The 2023 Northwoods League season was the 30th season of baseball in the Northwoods League, a collegiate summer baseball organization. The season concluded in August with the Green Bay Rockers winning the baseball championship.

== Baseball season overview ==
=== Background ===
In 2023, there were 24 Northwoods League (NWL) baseball teams, split evenly between the Great Lakes and Great Plains Divisions. These divisions were then split up between the Great Lakes East, Great Lakes West, Great Plains East, and Great Plains West subdivisions. The Kalamazoo Growlers entered the season as defending champions, having defeated the Duluth Huskies 8-2 in the league's 2022 championship game.

The Minot Hot Tots of Minot, North Dakota were added as an expansion team, becoming the second North Dakotan team in the NWL after the Bismarck Larks. Minot had previously hosted an NWL team, the Minot Greenheads, for one season in 2000. The Hot Tots were slotted into the Great Plains West division.

The Thunder Bay Border Cats returned to the NWL after a three season hiatus due to Covid-19 restrictions on travel across the US-Canada border. The Minnesota Mud Puppies, a temporary travel team created to take the place of the Border Cats, were retained despite the return of Thunder Bay. This kept the league at an even number of teams with 24.

=== Season ===
The regular season began on May 29, with the season split into two halves, and the top two teams in each sub-division—the standings leader from each half—qualified for the playoffs. The first half sub-division winners were the Traverse City Pit Spitters (Great Lakes East), Green Bay Rockers (Great Lakes West), Eau Claire Express (Great Plains East), and Willmar Stingers (Great Plains West). The second half sub-division winners were the Kalamazoo Growlers (Great Lakes East), Madison Mallards (Great Lakes West), La Crosse Loggers (Great Plains East), and St. Cloud Rox (Great Plains West).

In the four best-of-three subdivision series, the Pit Spitters took 2 of 3 from the Growlers, the Rockers swept the Mallards, the Loggers swept the Express, and the Rox swept the Stingers. In the single-game Great Lakes Division championship, the Rockers defeated the Pit Spitters, and in the Great Plains, the Rox defeated the Loggers.

The NWL Championship game was held at Joe Faber Field in St. Cloud, Minnesota on 8/18/23. Green Bay led from the third inning on, despite a late rally by the Rox in the ninth inning, and defeated St. Cloud 4-3. The Rockers won their first NWL Championship.

=== Individual achievements ===
Shortstop Michael Hallquist of the Duluth Huskies was named 2023 NWL Player of the Year after batting .353 with 13 home runs, 18 doubles, three triples, and 59 RBI. Brett Sanchez of the Green Bay Rockers was named 2023 NWL Pitcher of the Year. Sanchez appeared in 10 games, going 6-2 with a 3.23 ERA. In 61.1 innings pitched, he struck out 73 batters while walking only 10. He also pitched six innings in the Rockers' NWL Championship victory, earning the win.

In the 2023 Major League Baseball draft, 90 former NWL players were selected by MLB teams, including five players going in the first round. Jacob Wilson was the highest-selected of these alums, going 6th overall to the Oakland Athletics. Condon had played for Mankato in 2021. Other first round selections were Tommy Troy (Traverse City), Kyle Teel (Wisconsin Rapids), Chase Davis (La Crosse), and Brice Matthews (St. Cloud).

== Standings ==
=== Great Lakes Division ===
Great Lakes East Sub-Division Regular Season Standings
Pos	Team	G	W	L	Pct.
1	y – Kalamazoo Growlers	70	46	24	.657
2	Rockford Rivets	72	45	27	.625
3	x – Traverse City Pit Spitters	72	42	30	.583
4	Kenosha Kingfish	72	31	41	.431
5	Kokomo Jackrabbits	72	27	45	.375
6	Battle Creek Battle Jacks	72	26	46	.361

Great Lakes West Sub-Division Regular Season Standings
Pos	Team	G	W	L	Pct.
1	x – Green Bay Rockers	72	41	31	.569
2	Wisconsin Rapids Rafters	71	40	31	.563
3	y – Madison Mallards	71	39	32	.549
4	Wausau Woodchucks	72	35	37	.486
5	Fond du Lac Dock Spiders	72	30	42	.417
6	Lakeshore Chinooks	71	27	44	.380

=== Great Plains Division ===
Great Plains East Sub-Division Regular Season Standings
Pos	Team	G	W	L	Pct.
1	y – La Crosse Loggers	68	40	28	.588
2	Waterloo Bucks	68	37	31	.544
3	x – Eau Claire Express	67	36	31	.537
4	Duluth Huskies	68	36	32	.529
5	Rochester Honkers	68	32	36	.471
6	Thunder Bay Border Cats	68	27	41	.397

Great Plains West Sub-Division Regular Season Standings
Pos	Team	G	W	L	Pct.
1	x – Willmar Stingers	67	51	16	.761
2	y – St. Cloud Rox	68	43	25	.632
3	Mankato MoonDogs	68	38	30	.559
4	Bismarck Larks	67	26	41	.388
5	Minnesota Mud Puppies	44	12	32	.273
6	Minot Hot Tots	67	16	51	.239

- x – First Half Winner, clinched playoff spot
- y – Second Half Winner, clinched playoff spot

== Playoffs ==
=== Format ===
First and second half sub-divisional winners were eligible for the playoffs. The two playoff-eligible teams in each sub-division competed in a best-of-three Sub-Divisional Series. The two Sub-Divisional Series winners played a one-game Divisional Championship Game. The two Divisional Championship Game winners played a one-game League Championship.

=== Playoff bracket ===
Sub-Division Championship Series
1	Kalamazoo	2	18	0
2	Traverse City	3	6	6
↑ Great Lakes East / ↓ Great Lakes West
1	Green Bay	8	5
2	Madison	4	4
↑ Great Lakes / ↓ Great Plains
1	La Crosse	2	6
2	Eau Claire	1	2
↑ Great Plains East / ↓ Great Plains West
1	Willmar	3	7
2	St. Cloud	4	8

Division Championship
1	Traverse City	14
2	Green Bay	15
1	St. Cloud	9
2	La Crosse	8

Northwoods League Championship
1	St. Cloud	3
2	Green Bay	4

== Statistical leaders ==
For cumulative stats, leaders include all league players. For rate stats, leaders include only qualifiers. Qualified hitters must have 2.70 plate appearances per team game. Per NWL standards, qualified pitchers must have minimum .80 innings pitched per team game. This significantly limits the pool of those qualifying for pitching rate stats.

=== Hitting ===
Stat	Player	Team	Total
H	Kevin Fitzer	Stingers	78
HR	Kevin Fitzer, Michael Hallquist	Stingers, Huskies	15
RBI	Brandon Compton	Huskies	71
AVG	Joshua Duarte	Huskies	.398
OPS	Michael Hallquist	Huskies	1.115
SB	Parker Brosius	Pit Spitters	42

=== Pitching ===
Stat	Player	Team	Total
ERA	Eamon Horwedel	Growlers	2.30
W	Mason Meeks	Growlers	7
SO	Brett Sanchez	Rockers	73
SV	Tucker Shalley	Kingfish	11

== All-Star selections ==
=== Mid-season All-Star Game ===
In 2023, there were two Northwoods League All-Star Games, one for each division. The Great Lakes division game was held at Turtle Creek Stadium in Traverse City, Michigan and the Great Plains division game was held at Bismarck Municipal Ballpark in Bismarck, North Dakota. The following players were selected to participate in the All-Star games.

Great Lakes Division

Hitters
Position	Player	Team
C	Tony Lindwedel	Rivets
C	Tyler Minnick	Pit Spitters
C	Carlos Hernandez	Rockers
C	Canyon Brown	Mallards
1B	Colin Summerhill	Pit Spitters
1B	Colin Brueggeman	Woodchucks
2B	Jeter Ybarra	Growlers
2B	Jesse Donohoe	Woodchucks
3B	Glenn Miller	Pit Spitters
3B	Ryan Sprock	Mallards
SS	Fischer Pyatt	Battle Jacks
SS	Gabe Roessler	Chinooks
IF	Nick DeMarco	Rivets
IF	Jack Gurevitch	Rafters
DH	Roman Kuntz	Jackrabbits
DH	Owen Jackson	Mallards
OF	Parker Brosius	Pit Spitters
OF	Casen Taggert	Growlers
OF	Lance Trippel	Kingfish
OF	Charlie Rhee	Battle Jacks
OF	Braden Duhon	Rivets
OF	Karson Hesser	Jackrabbits
OF	Dalton Pearson	Woodchucks
OF	Travis Strickler	Dock Spiders
OF	JoJo Jackson	Rockers
OF	Brendan Bobo	Rafters
OF	Ty Johnson	Rafters

Pitchers
Position	Player	Team
P	Brett Sanchez	Rockers
P	Nate Nabholz	Woodchucks
P	Cole Hentschel	Woodchucks
P	Jacob Rosenkranz	Rafters
P	Calen Graham	Rafters
P	Jacob Faulkner	Rockers
P	Tyler Horvath	Rockers
P	Justin Doyle	Dock Spiders
P	Blake Kunz	Chinooks
P	Tommy Meyer	Mallards
P	Matt Mueller	Chinooks
P	Kyle Stoddard	Rockers
P	Julian Tristan	Rafters
P	Jerad Berkenpas	Growlers
P	Mason Meeks	Growlers
P	Sam Carlisle	Growlers
P	Dylan Howanitz	Battle Jacks
P	Jonathan Laguire-Cruz	Jackrabbits
P	Nick Powers	Pit Spitters
P	Eamon Horwedel	Growlers
P	CJ Fleeman	Jackrabbits
P	Tucker Shalley	Kingfish
P	Ross Thompson	Kingfish
P	Nick Vollmert	Rivets
P	Mitch White	Pit Spitters
P	Ethan Foley	Pit Spitters

Great Plains Division

Hitters
Position	Player	Team
C	Camden Ross	Express
C	Dylan King	Loggers
C	Cole Ketzner	Border Cats
C	Ari Armas	MoonDogs
C	Drey Dirksen	Stingers
1B	Ryan Nagelbach	Express
1B	Kip Fougerousse	MoonDogs
2B	Ben North	Honkers
2B	Nick Oakley	Larks
3B	Calyn Halvorson	Huskies
3B	Kyle Payne	Stingers
SS	Michael Hallquist	Huskies
SS	Ben Rosengard	Larks
IF	Dylan O'Connell	Express
IF	Jackson Hauge	Rox
IF	Stone Miyao	Stingers
IF	Tanner Recchio	Mud Puppies
DH	Brandon Compton	Huskies
DH	Brendan Hord	MoonDogs
DH	Kevin Fitzer	Stingers
OF	Joshua Duarte	Huskies
OF	Kimo Fukofuka	Honkers
OF	Cole Hill	Bucks
OF	Kasen Wells	Huskies
OF	Reed Latimer	Express
OF	Travis Chestnut	Border Cats
OF	Kai Roberts	MoonDogs
OF	Max Williams	MoonDogs
OF	Jackson Beaman	Larks
OF	Drew Woodcox	Mud Puppies
OF	John Nett	Rox
OF	Jack Herring	Larks

Pitchers
Position	Player	Team
P	Will Lavin	Honkers
P	Austin Humphres	Huskies
P	Tony Pluta	Loggers
P	Jack Pineau	Border Cats
P	Daniel Willie	Honkers
P	DJ Burke	Huskies
P	Isaiah Katz	Express
P	Will Droll	Border Cats
P	Aaron Savary	Bucks
P	Chaney Trout	Bucks
P	Sam Skarich	Bucks
P	Jake Gebb	Loggers
P	Kolby Kiser	MoonDogs
P	Cade Lommel	Rox
P	Joshua Dykhoff	Mud Puppies
P	Derrick Smith	MoonDogs
P	Caleb Strack	MoonDogs
P	Piercen McElyea	Rox
P	Tommy Gross	Rox
P	Brad Helton	Larks
P	Grant Garza	MoonDogs
P	John Lundgren	MoonDogs
P	Mason Olson	Rox
P	Chris Rofe	Stingers

=== Full-season All-Stars ===
After the season concluded, the league announced its Post-Season All-Stars for the full regular season. This group included players who performed well over the course of the entire season. Several players were selected to both the mid-season All-Star Game and the Post-Season All-Star team.

Great Lakes Division

Hitters
Position	Player	Team
C	Canyon Brown	Mallards
1B	Colin Brueggeman	Woodchucks
2B	Jesse Donohoe	Woodchucks
3B	Jeter Ybarra	Growlers
SS	Cal Fisher	Mallards
OF	Brendan Bobo	Rafters
OF	Dalton Pearson	Woodchucks
OF	JoJo Jackson	Rockers
DH	Owen Jackson	Mallards

Pitchers
Position	Player	Team
P	Brett Sanchez	Rockers
P	Eamon Horwedel	Growlers
P	Aren Gustafson	Pit Spitters
P	Mason Meeks	Growlers
P	Calen Graham	Rafters
P	Josh Howitt	Rafters

Great Plains Division

Hitters
Position	Player	Team
C	Drey Dirksen	Stingers
1B	Kip Fougerousse	MoonDogs
2B	Stone Miyao	Stingers
3B	Dylan O'Connell	Express
SS	Michael Hallquist	Huskies
OF	Joshua Duarte	Huskies
OF	Kai Roberts	MoonDogs
OF	Kevin Fitzer	Stingers
DH	Brandon Compton	Huskies

Pitchers
Position	Player	Team
P	Kolby Kiser	MoonDogs
P	Piercen McElyea	Rox
P	Tommy Gross	Rox
P	Tony Pluta	Loggers
P	Chris Rofe	Stingers
P	Aaron Savary	Bucks

== NWL alumni in MLB ==
=== MLB players who played in the NWL in 2023 ===
The following is a list of players who appeared in the NWL during the 2023 season, en route to a future career in MLB.

Name	2023 NWL team	MLB debut	MLB debut team
Ethan Pecko	Wausau Woodchucks	8/19/2026	Houston Astros

=== 2023 MLB debuts ===
The following is a list of NWL alums who made their Major League Baseball debuts in the 2023 MLB season.

Name	MLB debut	Debut team	Former NWL team(s)	Season(s) in NWL
Gus Varland	3/30	Brewers	Stingers	2017
César Salazar	4/2	Astros	Loggers	2016
Jeff Lindgren	4/3	Marlins	Larks	2017-18
Jesse Scholtens	4/7	White Sox	Chinooks	2015
McKinley Moore	4/10	Phillies	Rockers	2018
Brent Headrick	4/19	Twins	Woodchucks	2018
Michael Busch	4/25	Dodgers	Rox	2017
Joey Ortiz	4/27	Orioles	Stingers	2018
Zach Muckenhirn	5/3	Mets	Beetles	2014-15
Brandon Pfaadt	5/3	Diamondbacks	MoonDogs	2018
Gavin Stone	5/3	Dodgers	Bombers, Resorters	2019, 2020
Matt Mervis	5/5	Cubs	Growlers	2018
Brandon Williamson	5/16	Reds	Border Cats	2017
Grant Hartwig	6/19	Mets	Chinooks, Bombers	2019, 2020
Alec Marsh	6/30	Royals	Chinooks	2017
Kyle Leahy	7/7	Cardinals	Bucks	2016-17
Zack Gelof	7/14	Athletics	Growlers	2019
Taylor Kohlwey	7/19	Padres	Loggers, Woodchucks	2014, 2014-15
Lane Ramsey	8/6	White Sox	Express	2017
Wade Meckler	8/14	Giants	Huskies	2019
Jordan Wicks	8/26	Cubs	Rivets	2020
Mason McCoy	8/30	Blue Jays	Loggers	2015-16
Nick Loftin	9/1	Royals	Woodchucks	2018
Luke Little	9/6	Cubs	Pit Spitters	2019
Joe Boyle	9/17	Athletics	Growlers	2018
Cam Eden	9/21	Blue Jays	Rox	2017
Irving Lopez	9/23	Cardinals	Express	2015
Caleb Boushley	9/29	Brewers	Express	2016

=== Awards and highlights ===
NWL alums selected the 2023 MLB All-Star Game:

- Pete Alonso (Madison Mallards, 2014)
- Marcus Semien (Alexandria Beetles, 2009-10)

NWL alums awarded with a 2023 Gold Glove:

- Matt Chapman (La Crosse Loggers, 2012)
- Nico Hoerner (Madison Mallards, 2016)

NWL alums awarded with a 2023 Silver Slugger:

- Marcus Semien (Alexandria Beetles, 2009-10)

NWL alums who were members of the World Series-winning Rangers:

- Dane Dunning (Waterloo Bucks, 2014)
- Mitch Garver (St. Cloud River Bats, 2010–11)
- Max Scherzer (La Crosse Loggers, 2004)
- Marcus Semien (Alexandria Beetles, 2009-10)

== See also ==
- 2023 Major League Baseball season
