= Kalamazoo Growlers =

Baseball team from Kalamazoo, Michigan, USA

- Logo

Information
- League: Northwoods League (Great Lakes East Division 2019, 2021-Present) (Michigan South Division 2020) (South Division 2014-2018)
- Location: Kalamazoo, Michigan
- Ballpark: Honor Credit Union Stadium
- Founded: 2013
- League championships: 2022; 2024
- Division championships: 2022; 2024
- Colors: Navy, teal, gold, white
- Mascot: Porter
- Retired numbers: 2
- Ownership: Brian Colopy
- Coach: Cody Piechocki
- Media: http://mixlr.com/kzoo-growlers/
- Website: growlersbaseball.com

The Kalamazoo Growlers are a baseball team based in Kalamazoo, Michigan, that play in the Northwoods League, a summer collegiate baseball league. The team plays its home games at Homer Stryker Field, inside Honor Credit Union Stadium.

== History ==
On June 2013, the Kalamazoo City Commission approved a contract with Kalamazoo Baseball, LLC to bring a team back to the city. Kalamazoo had been without a baseball team since the Kalamazoo Kings of the Frontier League disbanded in 2011. The contract stipulated that the Northwoods League would pay expenses associated with the team's home games, practice and the maintenance of Homer Stryker Field.

In November 2013, the team was formally introduced as the Kalamazoo Growlers, a tribute to the city's brewing tradition (referencing growlers) as well as the American black bears that can be heard "growling" in the forests of Michigan.

The Growlers played their first game as part of an opening day double-header on May 28, 2014, losing to the then-defending league champion Madison Mallards 6-2. They won the second game of the double-header 6-5, securing their first ever win. The Growlers played their first home game on May 30, 2014, beating the Battle Creek Bombers 13-3. The announced attendance of their first home game (4,910 people) broke the record for highest attendance in any Northwoods League game.

On July 24, 2018, the team hosted the Northwoods League All Star Game as well as a celebration for the league's 25th anniversary. Three Growlers players represented the South Division in the game, which was a victory over the North Division 2-1. Three Growlers also competed in the Home Run Derby, which was won by Growlers Player Zach Daniels who hit three home runs.

In 2020, the Northwoods League responded to the Covid-19 pandemic by organizing teams into small regional pods. The Growlers were placed in the Michigan South Division with the Battle Creek Bombers and a new team identity created by the Growlers called the Kalamazoo Mac Daddies. The Mac Daddies was a temporary team operated by the Growlers' organization and was disbanded after the 2020 season.

In 2022, the Growlers secured a playoff berth with the top record in the Great Lakes East sub-division for the first half of the season. In a best-of-three subdivision series, the Growlers swept the Traverse City Pit Spitters. In the single-game Great Lakes Division championship, the Growlers defeated the Wisconsin Rapids Rafters. The League Championship game was held at historic Wade Stadium in Duluth, Minnesota on 8/18/22. Kalamazoo led from the second inning on and defeated Duluth 8-3. The Growlers won their first Northwoods League Championship.

In 2024, the Growlers made the playoffs by having the best record in the second half of play in the Great Lakes East subdivision. They competed against the Rockford Rivets In the single-game Great Lakes Division championship, the Growlers defeated the Madison Mallards. The Northwoods League Championship game was held at Homer Stryker Field on 8/15/24. At the end of 7 innings, the score was tied 7-7 and would stay at that until the bottom of the 14th inning. Brandon Sanchez hit a sacrifice fly and scored Gabe Springer. The Growlers won their second league championship.

== Seasons ==
Year	W-L-T	WPCT	Place	I-94 Rivalry (vs. Battle Creek)	Postseason
2014	29-43	.403	8th NWL South	Won: 5-3	Did not qualify
2015	17-55	.236	9th NWL South	Lost: 0-8	Did not qualify
2016	33-39	.458	5th NWL South	Lost: 2-6	Did not qualify
2017	28-44	.389	6th NWL South	Lost: 1-7	Did not qualify
2018	41-31	.569	2nd NWL South	Won: 5-3	Wild Card: Beat the Kenosha Kingfish 5-3. Division Championship: Lost to the Fond du Lac Dock Spiders 3-1.
2019	37-35	.514	2nd NWL GLE	Won: 8-4	Subdivision Championship: Lost to the Traverse City Pit Spitters 2 games to 0.
2020	40-25-6	.597	1st NWL MIS	Won: 19-13-3	Lost to the Kalamazoo Mac Daddies 4-2
2021	26-46	.361	6th NWL GLE	Won: 6-6 (Retained, tiebreaker goes to previous winner)	Did not qualify
2022	36-35	.507	3rd NWL GLE	Won: 9-3	Subdivision Championship: Beat the Traverse City Pit Spitters 2 games to 0. Division Championship: Beat the Wisconsin Rapids Rafters 8-6 League Championship: Beat the Duluth Huskies 8-3
2023	46-24	.657	1st NWL GLE	Won: 10-2	Subdivision Championship: Lost to the Traverse City Pit Spitters 2 games to 1.
2024	42-30	.583	2nd NWL GLE	Won: 10-2	Subdivision Championship: Beat the Rockford Rivets 2 games to 1. Division Championship: Beat the Madison Mallards 3-2 League Championship: Beat the La Crosse Loggers 8-7 in 14 innings.
2025	37-35	.514	2nd NWL GLE	Lost: 5-7	Subdivision Championship: Lost to the Traverse City Pit Spitters 2 games to 0.
2026	36-36	.500	4th NWL GLE	Won: 8-3	Did not qualify
Overall (Regular Season)	448-478-6	.484			

== Mascot ==
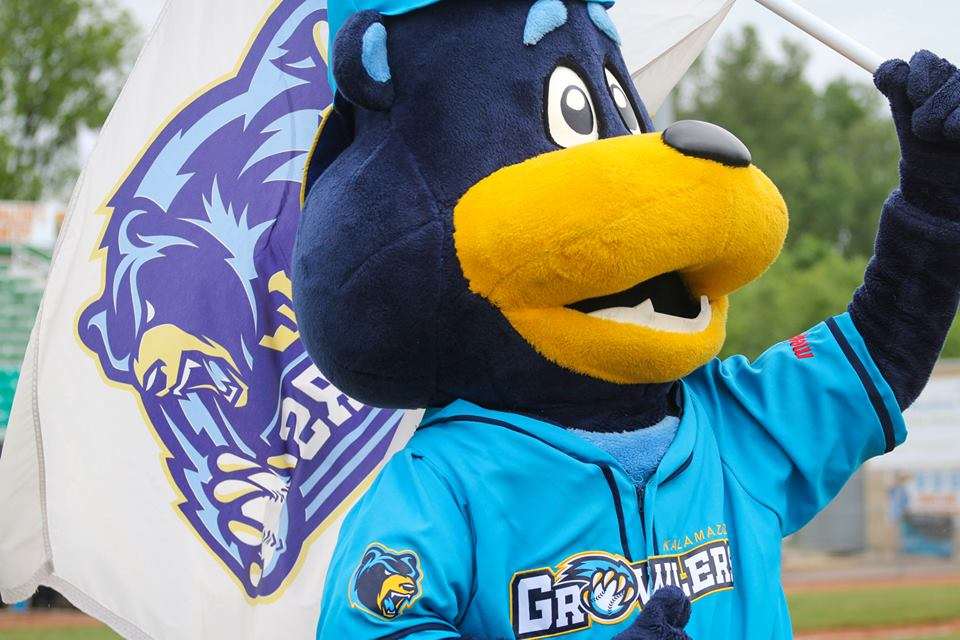
Porter

The mascot of the team is an anthropomorphic black bear named Porter. He was named after a dark style of beer and wears jersey number 64 (number of ounces held in a growler), which pays homage to Kalamazoo's microbreweries. The original mascot was named Barlee, but the team lost the rights of the name to the Hillsboro Hops of the Northwest League.

== MLB alumni ==
On August 9, 2019, John Schreiber became the first former Growler to reach the major leagues when he made his major league debut pitching in relief for the Detroit Tigers.

The following is a complete list of Growlers who have appeared in MLB:

Name	MLB teams played for	Years with Growlers	MLB Debut
John Schreiber	Detroit Tigers, Boston Red Sox, Kansas City Royals, New York Yankees	2014	August 9, 2019
Caleb Baragar	San Francisco Giants	2014	July 25, 2020
Brandon Hughes	Chicago Cubs, Arizona Diamondbacks	2015	May 17, 2022
Charles Leblanc	Miami Marlins, Los Angeles Angels	2015	July 30, 2022
David Hensley	Houston Astros, Miami Marlins	2016	August 27, 2022
Matt Mervis	Chicago Cubs, Miami Marlins	2018	May 5, 2023
Zack Gelof	Oakland Athletics, Athletics	2019	July 14, 2023
Joe Boyle	Oakland Athletics, Tampa Bay Rays	2018	September 17, 2023
Joey Loperfido	Houston Astros, Toronto Blue Jays	2018	April 20, 2024
Blake Dunn	Cincinnati Reds	2020–2021	June 4, 2024
Niko Kavadas	Los Angeles Angels	2018	August 16, 2024
Grant Wolfram	Baltimore Orioles	2016	April 26, 2025
Tanner Andrews	Toronto Blue Jays	2016	May 25, 2026
Mike Paredes	Minnesota Twins	2019	May 31, 2026
Ivan Johnson	Cincinnati Reds	2018	June 30, 2026
