= Lakeshore Chinooks =

Minor-league baseball team in Mequon, Wisconsin, U.S.

Information
- League: Northwoods League (South Division 2012–2018) (Great Lakes West 2019–present)
- Location: Mequon, Wisconsin, U.S.
- Ballpark: Kapco Park
- Founded: 2012
- Division championships: 1 (2014)
- League championships: 1 (2014)
- Colors: Navy, light blue, salmon, white
- Ownership: Jim Kacmarcik; Jon Hammes; Dan Laine; Jeff Prochnow; Robin Yount; Carl Claerbout; Scott Roeker; Dave Fischer; Tom Multerer; Bill Johnson; Bob Johnson
- General manager: Arie Bankston
- Manager: Brian Gregory
- Media: Milwaukee Journal Sentinel
- Website: LakeshoreChinooks.com

The Lakeshore Chinooks are a baseball team based in Mequon, Wisconsin, United States and a member of the Northwoods League, a collegiate summer baseball league. The Chinooks play their home games at Kapco Park on the campus of Concordia University Wisconsin.

== History ==
Founded in 2012, the Lakeshore Chinooks became the seventh Northwoods League team in Wisconsin. Based at Concordia University Wisconsin in Mequon, a northern suburb of Milwaukee, the Chinooks were the first Northwoods League franchise to make its home in a major metropolitan area.

The inaugural season began May 30, 2012, with a 2-1 road victory over the Green Bay Bullfrogs. The home opener was June 11, a 6-5 win over the Battle Creek Bombers.

On May 30, 2013, the Chinooks held their home opener, where Major League Baseball commissioner Bud Selig threw the first pitch to Major League Baseball Hall of Fame member and Chinooks minority owner Robin Yount. The Chinooks won their division, capturing their first playoff berth. They were defeated in the first round by the Madison Mallards two games to one.

In 2013, future MLB standout Harrison Bader suited up for Lakeshore. While playing for the Chinooks, Bader lived with Craig Counsell and his family at their home in Whitefish Bay, Wisconsin.

In 2014, the Chinooks became just the third team in league history to accumulate 50 victories, winning the organization's third-straight South Division half title. The team swept the Wisconsin Woodchucks two games to none in the division playoff to advance to the franchise's first championship appearance. Against the North Division champion Mankato MoonDogs, the Chinooks won the first game of the series in Mankato, 5–4, before returning to Mequon and completing their undefeated run through the playoffs with a 3–0 victory in game two to clinch the franchise's first-ever league championship.

On July 4, 2015, first baseman Luke Raley became the first player in league history to hit four home runs in a single game.

On July 3, 2017, shortstop Owen Miller hit for the cycle in a game against the Kalamazoo Growlers. Two days later, he hit for another cycle against Rockford Rivets, becoming the first player in league history to hit for multiple cycles.

On June 15, 2020, the Chinooks announced that they would not be participating in the first two weeks of the modified 2020 season amidst the COVID-19 pandemic. Two weeks later, the team cancelled their season altogether. The team returned to play in 2021.

== Season-by-season records ==
Year	Division	Overall record	Postseason
2012	South	35-35	Did not qualify
2013	South	44-26	Won second half Division title Lost division playoffs vs. Madison Mallards 1–2
2014	South	50-21	Won first half Division title Won division playoffs vs. Wisconsin Woodchucks 2–0; Won championship vs. Mankato MoonDogs 2–0
2015	South	36-36	Did not qualify
2016	South	35-37	Lost quarterfinals vs. Wisconsin Rapids Rafters 0–1
2017	South	38-34	Lost quarterfinals vs. Wisconsin Rapids Rafters 0–1
2018	South	29-42	Did not qualify
2019	Great Lakes West	32-40	Did not qualify
2020	Did not play due to COVID-19 pandemic		
2021	Great Lakes West	31-39	Did not qualify
2022	Great Lakes West	36-36	Did not qualify
2023	Great Lakes West	27-44	Did not qualify
2024	Great Lakes West	26-43	Did not qualify
2025	Great Lakes West	28-44	Did not qualify
2026	Great Lakes West	43-27	Won second half Division title Lost divisional series vs. Madison Mallards 0-2

== Ballpark ==
In 2011, Kapco Inc., a metal fabrication and stamping company in Grafton, donated $1 million toward completion of Concordia University Wisconsin's new baseball field, named Kapco Park. The donation was part of a $2.7 million fund already allocated for the stadium. Concordia's baseball team uses Kapco Park in the spring.

The Chinooks were the first Northwoods League franchise to make its home on a university campus. Kapco Park acknowledges the Milwaukee Brewers with its outfield dimensions; 317 feet in left for Jim Gantner (who wore number 17), 344 to left-center for Hank Aaron (who wore number 44), 404 to center for Paul Molitor (who wore number 4) and 319 to right for Robin Yount (who wore number 19), the latter of whom helped design the fence.

In 2012, the Wisconsin Interscholastic Athletic Association (WIAA) moved the State High School summer baseball tournament to Kapco Park until the tournament ended in 2018.

Kapco Park hosted the 2014 Northwoods League All-Star Game on July 22, 2014.

== Ownership ==
The Chinooks' ownership group previously consisted of a number of investors; most notably Jim Kacmarcik, president of Kapco, and Baseball Hall of Famer Robin Yount.

On September 10th, 2021, BYB Sports Investment Group, led by David Casey and Todd Kolosso, announced the purchase of the Lakeshore Chinooks.

== Awards ==
=== League awards ===
Year	Player	Award
2014	Mark Moriarty	Coach of the Year
2014	Eddy Morgan	Manager of the Year
2016	Marshall Kasowski	Pitcher of the Year

=== Postseason All-Stars ===
Year	Player	Pos.	College
2012	Ryan Harris	P	Texas Tech
2012	Eric Aguilera	DH	Illinois State
2012	Bre Kimball	3B	Louisiana Tech
2013	Mitch Sewald	P	LSU
2013	Kyle Bouman	P	Jefferson College (MO)
2014	Lake Tuttle	P	Milwaukee
2014	Andrew Elliot	P	Wright State
2014	Brett Siddall	OF	Canisius
2015	Lake Bachar	P	Wisconsin–Whitewater
2015	Lucas Raley	OF	Lake Erie
2016	Marshall Kasowski	P	Houston
2017	Jacob Richardson	3B	Southern Arkansas
2017	Matthew Mika	2B	UCF
2018	Jack Dunn	SS	Northwestern
2018	Dallas Beaver	C	UCF
2019	Daryl Myers	SS	Benedictine
2022	Mitch Mueller	P	Parkland College
2022	Matt DePrev	C	Xavier
2024	Cohen Achen	P	Lindsey Wilson College

== MLB alumni ==
Player	Chinooks season	Draft				MLB season(s)
Player	Chinooks season	Year	Rd	Pick	Team	MLB season(s)
Zack Granite	2012	2013	14	410	MIN	2017
Brian Anderson	2012	2014	3	76	MIA	2017–2024
Alex Young	2013	2015	2	43	ARI	2019–present
Andrew Stevenson	2013	2015	2	58	WAS	2017–2021, 2023
Harrison Bader	2013	2015	3	100	STL	2017–present
Eric Hanhold	2013	2015	6	181	MIL	2018, 2021
Shaun Anderson	2014	2016	3	88	BOS	2019–present
Cam Vieaux	2014	2016	6	195	PIT	2022
Jake Noll	2014	2016	7	214	WAS	2019–2020
Lake Bachar	2015	2016	5	144	MIA	2024–present
Luke Raley	2015	2016	7	221	LAD	2021–present
Jesse Scholtens	2015	2016	9	264	SD	2023, 2025-present
Greg Deichmann	2015	2017	2	43	OAK	2021
Zac Lowther	2015	2017	2	74	BAL	2021–2022
Mark Kolozsvary	2015	2017	7	197	CIN	2022–2023
Hayden Senger	2016	2018	24	710	NYM	2025–present
Owen Miller	2016–2017	2018	3	84	SD	2021–present
Alec Marsh	2017	2019	B	70	KC	2023–present
Will Klein	2019	2020	5	135	KC	2024–present
Grant Hartwig	2019	undrafted, 2021				2023–present
Hayden Birdsong	2022	2022	6	196	SF	2024–present
George Klassen	2022	2023	6	193	LAA	2026–present
Tyler Schweitzer	2021	2022	5	161	CHW	2026–present
Brian Keller	2015	2016	39	1178	NYY	2026-present
