= Fond du Lac Dock Spiders =

Logo	Cap insignia

Information
- League: Northwoods League (Great Lakes West 2019–present) (South Division 2017–2018)
- Location: Fond du Lac, Wisconsin
- Ballpark: Herr-Baker Field
- Founded: 2016
- League championships: 2018
- Division championships: 2018; 2020
- Colors: Navy, lake blue, tan, white, blue, brown
- Ownership: Third Base Ventures
- Management: Jim Misudek
- Manager: Sam Fonder
- Website: dockspiders.com

The Fond du Lac Dock Spiders are a baseball team that plays in the Northwoods League (a collegiate summer baseball league). Based in Fond du Lac, Wisconsin, the Dock Spiders play their home games at Herr-Baker Field on the campus of Marian University.

== History ==
On 15 August 2016, it was announced that the Wisconsin Timber Rattlers (Class A Midwest League affiliate of the Milwaukee Brewers) had partnered with Marian University to bring the 20th Northwoods League team to Fond du Lac. The on-campus Herr-Baker Field underwent renovations to accommodate the team.

A name-the-team contest was held, with the five finalists being Barn Owls, Dock Spiders, Lake Flies, Pipsqueaks and Shantymen. On November 21, the Dock Spiders name, logo and colors were officially announced. The team appeared in Sports Illustrated as the best attention-grabbing new baseball club name for 2017. The team logo was designed by San Diego marketing firm Brandiose.

In 2017, the team's inaugural season, the Dock Spiders went 38-34 (.528). After posting a 16–20 record in the first half, the Dock Spiders went 22–14 in the second half to finish 3 games out of 1st place. The overall record put the Dock Spiders in a tie for the final playoff spot in the South Division; however, the Dock Spiders missed on a 3-way tiebreaker with the Lakeshore Chinooks (who made the playoffs) and the Madison Mallards.

In 2018, the Dock Spiders compiled a 39–31 overall record (.557) to take the final playoff spot in the South Division, with split-half records of 21-13 and 18-18. In the playoffs, the Dock Spiders won road games over the Madison Mallards 17-5 and the Kalamazoo Growlers 3-1 to win the South Division title and advance to the championship series against the Duluth Huskies. Fond du Lac won the opening game of the best-of-3 series 3–0 at home, then lost at Duluth 8-1 before winning the deciding game 4-3 to clinch the team's first Northwoods League title in the franchise's second season of play. In 2019, the Dock Spiders went 36–35.

In 2020, the Northwoods League temporarily altered its structure due to the Covid-19 pandemic, operating with seven hyper-regional pod divisions. The Dock Spiders played in the Wisconsin-Illinois East Division alongside the Green Bay Booyah and Rockford Rivets. With a roster featuring several future MLB players, the Dock Spiders had a 31-17 record, best in the division. In the playoffs, they defeated the La Crosse Loggers 14–3 and claimed the Northwoods League Wisconsin-Illinois Pod Championship.

Following the 2020 season, team owners Appleton Baseball Club, Inc, sold the team to Third Base Ventures, LLC, a group consisting of principal owner Craig Dickman and minority owners team president Rob Zerjav and Brad Raaths.

In 2025, Milwaukee Brewers infielder and former Dock Spider Caleb Durbin returned to Fond du Lac for a promotional night while the Brewers had an off day. Durbin threw out the first pitch and signed autographs for fans. While in Fond du Lac, Durbin spent the night with his former host family.

== MLB alumni ==
Name	MLB teams played for	Year(s) with Spiders	MLB Debut	MLB Accolades
Nick Fortes	Marlins, Rays	2017	9/18/2021	AL Pennant Winner (2026)
Victor Scott II	Cardinals	2020–2021	3/28/2024	
Ryan Loutos	Cardinals, Dodgers, Nationals	2020–2021	6/1/2024	
Caleb Durbin	Brewers, Red Sox	2020–2021	4/18/2025	Gold Glove Award (2026)
Chandler Simpson	Rays	2021	4/19/2025	AL Stolen Base Leader (2026), AL Pennant Winner (2026)
Ryan Bergert	Padres, Royals	2020	4/26/2025	
Tim Elko	White Sox	2019–2020	5/10/2025	
Ryan Ritter	Rockies	2020	6/6/2025	

== Year-by-year records ==
Season	Overall record	Playoffs
2017	38-34 (.528)	Did not make playoffs
2018	39-31 (.557)	Defeated Madison Mallards Defeated Kalamazoo Growlers Defeated Duluth Huskies Northwoods League Champions
2019	36-35 (.507)	Did not make playoffs
2020	31-17 (.645)	Defeated Green Bay Booyah Defeated La Crosse Loggers Northwoods League WI-IL Pod Champions
2021	43-28 (.606)	Lost to Madison Mallards
2022	36-35 (.507)	Did not make playoffs
2023	30-42 (.417)	Did not make playoffs
2024	29-40 (.420)	Did not make playoffs
2025	32-40 (.444)	Did not make playoffs
2026	30-39 (.435)	Did not make playoffs
Total	344-341 (.502)	Total Playoff Series: 5 series won, 1 series lost 2 Championships
