= Traverse City Pit Spitters =

Collegiate summer baseball team in Traverse City, Michigan

- Logo

Information
- League: Northwoods League (Great Lakes East (2019–)
- Location: Chums Corner, Michigan
- Ballpark: Turtle Creek Stadium
- Founded: 2018
- Nickname: The Spitters
- League championships: 2019; 2021
- Division championships: 2019; 2021
- Colors: Red, black, white, dark red, green, blue
- Ownership: TC Baseball, LLC (Joe Chamberlin, CEO)
- Manager: Todd Reid
- Website: northwoodsleague.com/traverse-city-pit-spitters/

The Traverse City Pit Spitters are a baseball team in the Northwoods League, a collegiate summer baseball league, and began play in the 2019 season. Based out of Traverse City, Michigan, the Pit Spitters play their home games at Turtle Creek Stadium in nearby Chums Corner, Michigan.

== History ==
=== Background ===
Traverse City has a baseball history, beginning with the Traverse City Hustlers, a semi-professional team in the 1890s. The city had a minor league team, the Traverse City Resorters of the Class D West Michigan League and Michigan State League between 1910 and 1914. Baseball then returned to Traverse City in 2006 with the Traverse City Beach Bums of the independent Frontier League, but on September 26, 2018, it was announced that Wuerfel Park had been purchased by a new investment group led by the owners of the West Michigan Whitecaps (Class A Midwest League affiliate of MLB's Detroit Tigers), with the park's previous team, the Beach Bums, ceasing operations. The new ownership group announced plans to launch a new franchise in the Northwoods League for the 2019 season.

On October 25, 2018, the team named Josh Rebandt as their first field manager. A name-the-team contest was held until December 14, with six finalists: Black Pearls, Dogmen, Dune Bears, Pit Spitters, Tree Shakers and Sasquatch. On January 29, 2019, the Pit Spitters name and logos were officially announced with the name reflecting the amateur sport of cherry pit spitting, which is played during the annual National Cherry Festival in Traverse City.

=== 2019 inaugural season ===
May 28, 2019, served as the opening day for the Pit Spitters as they defeated the Green Bay Booyah 2–1 before 2,274 fans. The Pit Spitters advanced to the playoffs with an overall record of 52–20 (.722), winning both halves of the season. In the playoffs, the Pit Spitters first defeated the Kalamazoo Growlers 2–0 (8–1, 5–4) in a best-of-three series and then the Madison Mallards 3–2 to advance to the Northwoods League championship game.

The championship game was played at Pit Spitters Park in front of 4,636 fans as Traverse City had the better overall record. The Spitters trailed the Eau Claire Express 2–1 heading to the bottom of the ninth, but two Express errors, including a misplayed bunt off the bat of Traverse City's Andrew Morrow (Michigan State) with two outs allowed catcher Adam Proctor (Michigan State) to score and gave Traverse City a 3–2 victory, giving the Pit Spitters the Northwoods League title in their first season.

The 2019 Spitters were led by 1B Morrow (.263 BA, 6 HR, 58 RBI), Mario Camilletti (Central Michigan) (.297 BA, 29 RBI), OF Jake Wilson (Bowling Green) (.280 BA, 4 HR, 45 RBI), and pitchers Andrew Hoffmann (Oakland University) (8–0, 1.08 ERA) and Joe Pace (Michigan) (0–1, 6 saves, 0.50 ERA). Manager Josh Rebrandt was named Northwoods League Manager of the Year.

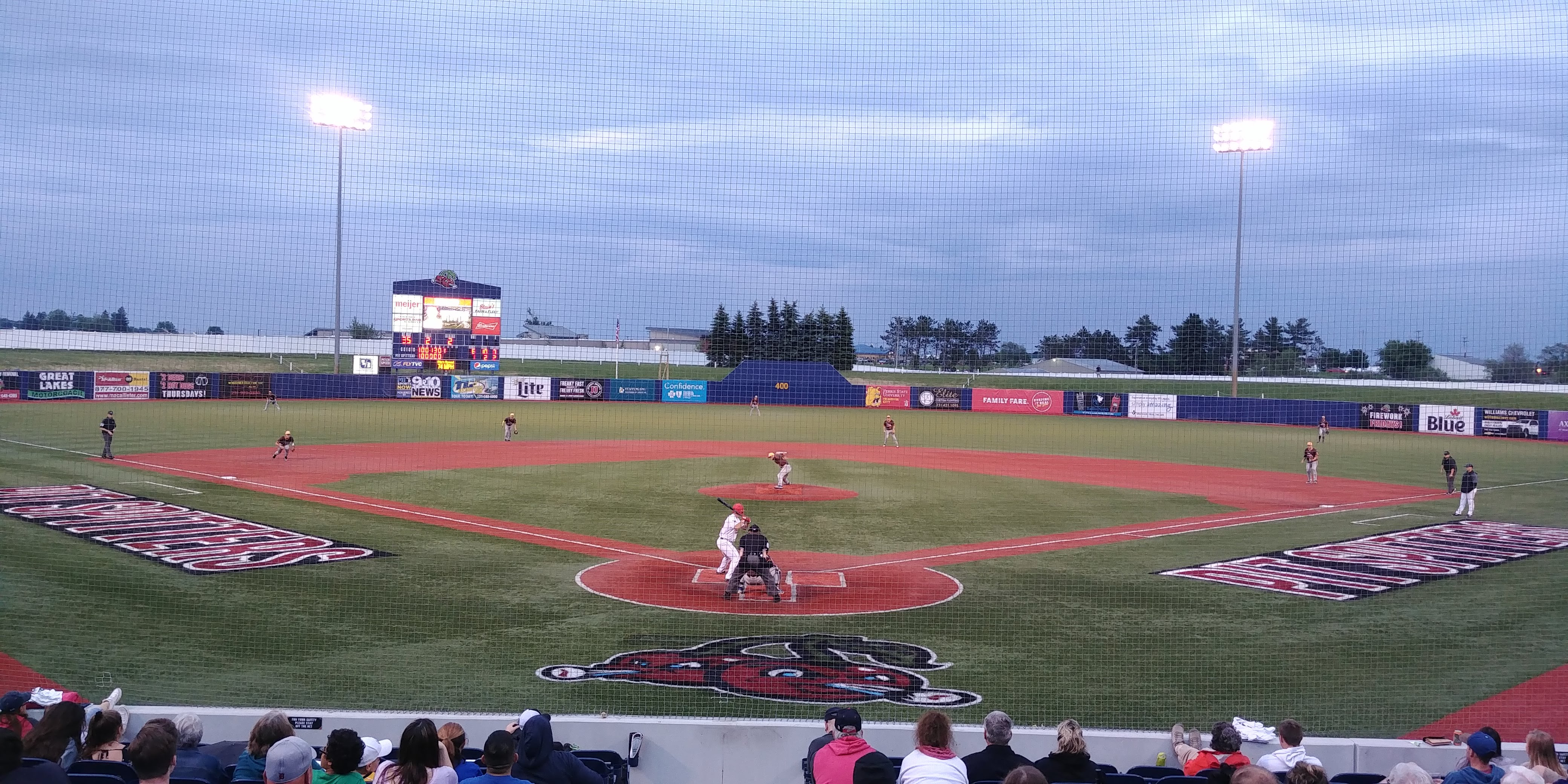
Traverse City Pit Spitters home game, June 2019

=== 2020 pod season and temporary teams ===
In 2020, due to COVID-19 pandemic restrictions, the Northwoods League set up regional pod divisions that included temporary teams. The Pit Spitters created the Great Lakes Resorters and Northern Michigan Dune Bears, with the three teams competing against each other in the Michigan North Division, as well as competition with Kalamazoo and Battle Creek in a greater "Michigan Pod." The Pit Spitters won the division before falling to the temporary Kalamazoo Mac Daddies in the pod championship. The Resorters and Dune Bears were dissolved after the 2020 season.

=== 2021 championship season ===
The Pit Spitters won their second Northwoods League championship in 2021. The team finished first in the Great Lakes East division in the first half with a record of 21–15 (.583), edging the Kenosha Kingfish by 1 game, guaranteeing a place in the playoffs. Traverse City would finish second in the 2nd half, 21–14 (.600), 3.5 games behind the Kokomo Jackrabbits.

Kokomo had home-field advantage for the opening best-of-three series with the better overall record, but Traverse City took the series 2–1 (9–2, 0–3, 9–6), scoring 3 runs in the 9th inning of the deciding game in Kokomo to take the series, with SS Christian Faust (Grand Valley State) singling in DH Michael Styges (Oakland University) to break the deadlock in the top of the 9th inning, and closer John Beuckelaere (Madonna University) securing the lead in the bottom of the inning for the series win.

Traverse City then defeated the Madison Mallards 6–2 at home in a single-game elimination behind a complete-game pitching performance by Joe Horoszko (Wittenberg University), advancing to the Northwoods League championship game. The Spitters faced the St. Cloud Rox on the road, winning the championship 9–3 with the strong pitching of Northwoods League Pitcher of the Year Cam Schuelke (Florida Gulf Coast University) and a home-run from Mario Camilletti (Central Michigan) making the difference.

The team was led on the season by 2B Camilletti (.312 BA, 34 RBI, 14 SB), OF Tito Flores (Michigan) (.295 BA, 41 RBI, 13 SB), and Northwoods League all-stars 1B Chris Monroe (Illinois-Springfield) (.303 BA, 7 HR, 59 RBI) and pitcher Schuelke (4–0, 0.68 ERA).

== MLB alumni ==
The following is a list of former Traverse City Northwoods League players to reach Major League Baseball. This list includes Pit Spitters as well as members of 2020 temporary teams.

| Name | MLB teams played for | Year(s) with Traverse City | MLB Debut |
|---|---|---|---|
| Gavin Stone | Los Angeles Dodgers | 2020 (Resorters) | May 3, 2023 |
| Luke Little | Chicago Cubs | 2019 | September 6, 2023 |
| Spencer Schwellenbach | Atlanta Braves | 2020 | April 29, 2024 |
| Seth Halvorsen | Colorado Rockies, Los Angeles Dodgers | 2020 (Resorters) | August 30, 2024 |
| Chad Patrick | Milwaukee Brewers | 2019–2020 | March 29, 2025 |
| Andrew Hoffmann | Kansas City Royals, Arizona Diamondbacks | 2019–2020 | May 30, 2025 |
| Jakob Marsee | Miami Marlins | 2020 (Resorters), 2022 | August 1, 2025 |
| Tommy Troy | Arizona Diamondbacks | 2020 | May 24, 2026 |
| Gabriel Hughes | Colorado Rockies | 2020 (Resorters) | July 3, 2026 |
