= 2018 Northwoods League season =

25th annual season of the Northwoods League

- League: Northwoods League
- Sport: Baseball
- Teams: 20

Northwoods League Championship
- Champions: Fond du Lac Dock Spiders
- Runners-up: Duluth Huskies

Seasons
- ← 2017 2019 →

The 2018 Northwoods League season was the 25th season of baseball in the Northwoods League, a collegiate summer baseball organization. The season concluded in August with the Fond du Lac Dock Spiders winning the championship.

== Season overview ==
=== Background ===
2018 was the 25th season for the Northwoods League (NWL). In 2018, the NWL had twenty teams, split evenly between a North and South Division. The St. Cloud Rox entered the season as defending champions, having defeated the Battle Creek Bombers in the 2017 NWL championship series.

=== Season ===
The regular season began in May, with the season split into two halves. The teams with the best records in the division for each half automatically qualified for a playoff berth, with two additional teams from each division added to the playoffs based on overall season record. This resulted in eight teams qualifying for the playoffs.

The playoff qualifiers for each division were as follows:

- North Division - Bismarck Larks, Duluth Huskies, Mankato MoonDogs, Willmar Stingers
- South Division - Fond du Lac Dock Spiders, Kalamazoo Growlers, Kenosha Kingfish, Madison Mallards

In the four single-elimination first round playoff games, the Huskies beat the Larks, the Stingers beat the MoonDogs, the Growlers beat the Kingfish, and the Dock Spiders beat the Mallards. In the single-game divisional championship round, the Dock Spiders defeated the Mallards and the Huskies defeated the Stingers.

The championship series (then known as the "Summer Collegiate World Series") was a best-of-three set between the Dock Spiders and the Huskies. The deciding third game was at historic Wade Stadium in Duluth, Minnesota. In a back and forth game, Fond du Lac defeated Duluth 4-3 and claimed their first NWL title.

=== Individual achievements ===
Augie Issacson of the Duluth Huskies was named 2018 NWL Most Valuable Player. Issacson led the league in batting average (.365) and stolen bases (39). He also went 3-for-4 at the NWL Major League Dreams showcase held in Madison, WI.

Justin Slaten of the Eau Claire Express was named 2018 NWL Pitcher of the Year. He appeared in 11 games (57 innings) and led the league in wins (7), strikeouts (70), and ERA (1.58).

In the 2018 Major League Baseball draft, 163 former NWL players were selected by MLB teams. Nico Hoerner was the highest-selected alum, going to the Chicago Cubs with the 24th pick. Hoerner had played for the Madison Mallards in 2016.

== Standings and playoffs ==
North Division
Pos	Team	W	L	Pct.
1	x – Willmar Stingers	48	24	.667
2	x – Duluth Huskies	47	25	.653
3	x – Mankato MoonDogs	46	26	.639
4	La Crosse Loggers	40	32	.556
5	x – Bismarck Larks	37	34	.521
6	St. Cloud Rox	37	35	.514
7	Rochester Honkers	34	38	.472
8	Eau Claire Express	28	43	.394
9	Thunder Bay Border Cats	22	50	.306
10	Waterloo Bucks	20	52	.278

South Division
Pos	Team	W	L	Pct.
1	x – Madison Mallards	49	23	.681
2	x – Kalamazoo Growlers	41	31	.569
3	x – Kenosha Kingfish	41	31	.569
4	x – Fond du Lac Dock Spiders	39	31	.557
5	Battle Creek Bombers	38	34	.528
6	Wisconsin Rapids Rafters	34	37	.479
7	Wisconsin Woodchucks	30	42	.417
8	Lakeshore Chinooks	29	42	.408
9	Rockford Rivets	28	43	.394
10	Green Bay Bullfrogs	28	44	.389

- x – Qualified for playoffs based on either best record (first or second half of season) or as a wildcard due to overall record.

=== Playoff bracket ===
Wildcard round
Willmar
Mankato
Duluth
Bismarck
↑ North Division ↓ South Division
Kalamazoo
Kenosha
Fond du Lac
Madison

Division Championship
Duluth
Willmar
Fond du Lac
Kalamazoo

League Championship series
Fond du Lac
Duluth

== Statistical leaders ==
Qualified hitters must have minimum of 71 at-bats per season.

=== Hitting ===
Stat	Player	Team	Total
H	Augie Issacson	Huskies	90
HR	Kyle MacDonald	MoonDogs	16
RBI	Kyle MacDonald	MoonDogs	75
AVG	Augie Issacson	Huskies	.364
OPS	Tyler Plantier	Mallards	.950
SB	Augie Issacson	Huskies	39

=== Pitching ===
Stat	Player	Team	Total
W	Justin Slaten	Express	7
SO	Justin Slaten	Express	70
SV	Trace Norkus	Mallards	14

== All-Star selections ==
=== Mid-season All-Star Game ===
The 2018 NWL mid-season All-Star Game was played on 7/24/18 at Homer Stryker Field in Kalamazoo, Michigan. The following players were selected to participate in the All-Star game.

North Division

Hitters
Position	Player	Team
C	Mike Farnell	Larks
C	Chris Gilbody	Huskies
1B	Kyle MacDonald	MoonDogs
2B	Augie Isaacson	Huskies
2B	Scott Ogrin	Express
3B	Landon Stephens	Rox
3B	Billy Cook	Border Cats
SS	Nick Sogard	Huskies
INF	Ripken Reyes	Larks
DH	Shane McGuire	Loggers
OF	Tyler Reichenborn	Stingers
OF	Harrison Freed	Loggers
OF	Cristian Montes	Larks
OF	Jake Shepski	MoonDogs
OF	Spencer Myers	Express
OF	Brendan Hueth	Bucks

Pitchers
Position	Player	Team
P	Hendry Rodriguez	Larks
P	Justin Slaten	Express
P	Brandon Pfaadt	MoonDogs
P	Phillip Sikes	Express
P	Adam Lukas	MoonDogs
P	Jon Ludwig	MoonDogs
P	Josh Ibarra	Honkers
P	Finn Del Bonta-Smith	Rox
P	Jack Cushing	Rox
P	Alexander Nolan	Border Cats
P	Troy Newell	Huskies
P	Ben Mora	Stingers
P	Chad Tworek	Honkers

South Division

Hitters
Position	Player	Team
C	Alec Cargin	Bombers
C	Ty Duvall	Rafters
1B	Niko Kavadas	Growlers
2B	Trevor Schwecke	Mallards
3B	Tyler Plantier	Mallards
SS	Jack Dunn	Chinooks
INF	David Vinsky	Mallards
DH	Jack-Thomas Wold	Rafters
OF	Jake Randa	Mallards
OF	Brody Wofford	Rafters
OF	Zach Daniels	Growlers
OF	Zach Gartner	Bombers
OF	Drew Campbell	Mallards

Pitchers
Position	Player	Team
P	Cooper Cain	Rivets
P	Kevin Tibor	Chinooks
P	Mason Shinabery	Growlers
P	Trace Norkus	Mallards
P	Lenny Gwizdala	Woodchucks
P	Mason McReaken	Rafters
P	Dalton Wiggins	Mallards
P	Josh Serio	Kingfish
P	Mike Hope	Dock Spiders
P	Jon Young	Dock Spiders
P	Trent Palmer	Kingfish
P	Carson Ragsdale	Mallards
P	Trayson Kubo	Rafters
P	Leo Perez	Bullfrogs
P	Frank Frate	Woodchucks

=== Full-season All-Stars ===
After the season concluded, the league announced its Post-Season All-Stars for the full regular season. This group included players who performed well over the course of the entire season. Several players were selected to both the mid-season All-Star Game and the Post-Season All-Star team.

South Division

Hitters
Position	Player	Team
C	Dallas Beaver	Chinooks
1B	David Vinsky	Mallards
2B	Trevor Schwecke	Mallards
3B	Tyler Plantier	Mallards
SS	Jack Dunn	Chinooks
OF	Jake Randa	Mallards
OF	Zach DeLoach	Woodchucks
OF	Zach Daniels	Growlers
DH	Jack-Thomas Wold	Rafters

Pitchers
Position	Player	Team
P	Cooper Cain	Rivets
P	Mason Shinabery	Growlers
P	Trace Norkus	Mallards
P	Lenny Gwizdala	Woodchucks
P	Jon Young	Dock Spiders
P	Trayson Kubo	Rafters

Great Plains Division

Hitters
Position	Player	Team
C	Chris Gilbody	Huskies
1B	Kyle MacDonald	MoonDogs
2B	Augie Isaacson	Huskies
3B	Billy Cook	Border Cats
SS	Braiden Ward	Loggers
OF	Tyler Reichenborn	Stingers
OF	Harrison Freed	Loggers
OF	Cristian Montes	Larks
OF	Cam Pearcey	Border Cats
DH	Shane McGuire	Loggers

Pitchers
Position	Player	Team
P	Hendry Rodriguez	Larks
P	Justin Slaten	Express
P	Brandon Pfaadt	MoonDogs
P	Adam Lukas	MoonDogs
P	Evan Johnson	Rox
P	Nick Mears	Stingers
P	Finn Del Bonta-Smith	Rox

== NWL alumni in MLB ==
=== MLB players who played in the NWL in 2018 ===
The following is a list of players who appeared in the NWL during the 2018 season, en route to a future appearance/career in MLB.

Name	2018 NWL team	MLB debut	MLB debut team
Nick Mears	Willmar Stingers	8/8/2020	Pittsburgh Pirates
Bryan Lavastida	Wisconsin Woodchucks	4/10/2022	Cleveland Guardians
Korey Lee	La Crosse Loggers	7/1/2022	Houston Astros
Garrett Mitchell	Mankato MoonDogs	8/27/2022	Milwaukee Brewers
Louis Varland	Willmar Stingers	9/7/2022	Minnesota Twins
Cole Waites	Wisconsin Rapids Rafters	9/13/2022	San Francisco Giants
Jeff Lindgren	Bismarck Larks	4/3/2023	Miami Marlins
McKinley Moore	Green Bay Bullfrogs	4/10/2023	Philadelphia Phillies
Brent Headrick	Wisconsin Woodchucks	4/19/2023	Minnesota Twins
Joey Ortiz	Willmar Stingers	4/27/2023	Baltimore Orioles
Brandon Pfaadt	Mankato MoonDogs	5/3/2023	Arizona Diamondbacks
Matt Mervis	Kalamazoo Growlers	5/5/2023	Chicago Cubs
Nick Loftin	Wisconsin Woodchucks	9/1/2023	Kansas City Royals
Joe Boyle	Kalamazoo Growlers	9/17/2023	Oakland Athletics
Justin Slaten	Eau Claire Express	3/30/2024	Boston Red Sox
Joey Loperfido	Kalamazoo Growlers	4/30/2024	Houston Astros
Chris Roycroft	Bismarck Larks	5/7/2024	St. Louis Cardinals
Zach DeLoach	Wisconsin Woodchucks	5/22/2024	Chicago White Sox
Hunter Bigge	Duluth Huskies	7/9/2024	Chicago Cubs
Will Warren	St. Cloud Rox	7/30/2024	New York Yankees
Eric Yang	Willmar Stingers	7/31/2024	Cincinnati Reds
Nick Sogard	Duluth Huskies	8/2/2024	Boston Red Sox
Will Wagner	Kenosha Kingfish	8/12/2024	Toronto Blue Jays
Niko Kavadas	Kalamazoo Growlers	8/16/2024	Los Angeles Angels
Billy Cook	Thunder Bay Border Cats	9/8/2024	Los Angeles Angels
Logan VanWey	Duluth Huskies	4/11/2025	Houston Astros
Colton Gordon	Kenosha Kingfish	5/14/2025	Houston Astros
Carson McCusker	Kenosha Kingfish	5/18/2025	Minnesota Twins
Bob Seymour	St. Cloud Rox	8/15/2025	Tampa Bay Rays
Christian Roa	La Crosse Loggers	9/6/2025	Miami Marlins
Carson Ragsdale	Madison Mallards	9/14/2025	Baltimore Orioles
Ivan Johnson	Kalamazoo Growlers	6/30/2026	Cincinnati Reds

=== Alums with 2018 MLB debuts ===
The following is a list of NWL alums who made their Major League Baseball debuts in the 2018 MLB season.

Name	MLB debut	Debut team	Former NWL team(s)	Season(s) in NWL
Adam Cimber	3/29	Padres	Bullfrogs	2011
Mike Gerber	4/20	Tigers	Woodchucks, Mallards	2011, 2012
Eric Stout	4/25	Royals	Bucks	2013
D.J. Snelten	4/28	Giants	Honkers	2011-12
Tim Peterson	5/30	Mets	Honkers, Loggers	2011
Ben Meyer	6/7	Marlins	Rox	2012
Jose Trevino	6/15	Rangers	Mallards	2012
Steve Wilkerson	6/20	Orioles	La Crosse Loggers	2011
Kevin Kaczmarski	6/24	Mets	Bucks	2012, 2014
Nate Orf	7/2	Brewers	Express	2010
Ray Black	7/8	Giants	Lunkers	2011
Drew Gagnon	7/10	Mets	Honkers	2009
Alex McRae	8/1	Pirates	Rox	2013
Wes Parsons	8/9	Braves	Border Cats	2012
Rowan Wick	8/31	Padres	Loggers	2011
Eric Hanhold	9/4	Mets	Chinooks	2013
Kevin Kramer	9/5	Pirates	Loggers	2012

=== Awards and highlights ===
NWL alums selected the 2018 MLB All-Star Game:

- Brandon Crawford (Mankato MoonDogs, 2005)
- Mitch Haniger (Green Bay Bullfrogs, 2011)
- Chris Sale (La Crosse Loggers, 2008)
- Max Scherzer (La Crosse Loggers, 2004)

NWL alums awarded with a 2018 Gold Glove:

- Matt Chapman (La Crosse Loggers, 2012)

NWL alums who were members of the World Series-winning Boston Red Sox:

- Chris Sale (La Crosse Loggers, 2008)

== See also ==
- 2018 Major League Baseball season
