= Wisconsin Rapids Rafters =

- Logo

Information
- League: Northwoods League (Great Lakes West 2019-pres) (South Division 2010-2018)
- Location: Wisconsin Rapids, Wisconsin
- Ballpark: Witter Field
- Founded: 2010
- Division championships: 1 (2016)
- League championships: 1 (2016)
- Colors: Cranberry, gold, black, white, tan, gray
- Ownership: Joe and Vinny Fonti
- Management: Ken Day (GM), Jake Adams (AGM), Connor Filipi (Media), Gwen Filipi (Sales)
- Manager: Tom Zieglowsky
- Media: Wisconsin Rapids Tribune
- Website: RaftersBaseball.com

The Wisconsin Rapids Rafters are a baseball team based in Wisconsin Rapids, Wisconsin that plays in the Northwoods League, a collegiate summer baseball league. The Rafters play home games at Witter Field.

== History ==
The Rafters were founded by Steve Schmitt and Vern Stenman, the owner and president, respectively, of the Madison Mallards. In the lead-up to their inaugural season, the team held an online vote to determine which of three fan-submitted identities (the Rafters, River Rats, and Boggers) would win. The Rafters ultimately won out, with the name a nod to the history using the Wisconsin River to transport logs. The team incorporated the River Rat as a mascot. The primary team color is cranberry red to honor the strong cranberry industry of the Wisconsin Rapids area.

Before their inaugural season, seats from old Milwaukee County Stadium were added to Witter Field, in addition to several other ballpark upgrades. The Rafters played their first home game on June 6, 2010. Witter Field hosted the Northwoods League All-Star Game in 2011 and 2015. Several future MLB players were on the 2015 All-Star rosters, including Daulton Varsho, Zach McKinstry, and Tony Gonsolin.

2016 was an excellent season for the Rafters. They finished the season with a 49-23 record, best among all 18 teams in the league. They defeated the Lakeshore Chinooks in the quarterfinals, the Battle Creek Bombers in the semifinals, and ultimately defeated the Eau Claire Express to win their first Northwoods League championship.

In 2017, the Rafters finished the season with a 52-20 record, best among the 20 NWL teams. They advanced to the single-elimination South Division championship game, but were defeated by the Battle Creek Bombers. Bryson Stott had a standout season for the Rafters en route to an MLB career. At age 19, after his freshman year at UNLV, Stott had 342 plate appearances across 71 games, batting .352 with a league-leading 100 hits. He also added 26 stolen bases.

In 2020, the Northwoods League temporarily altered their structure due to the Covid-19 pandemic, operating with seven hyper-regional pod divisions. The Rafters played in the Wisconsin-Illinois West Division alongside the Wisconsin Woodchucks and La Crosse Loggers. With a roster featuring several future MLB players, the Rafters had a 35-11 record, best in the division. Spencer Arrighetti appeared in seven games (24 innings) and had a perfect 0.00 ERA, with 37 strikeouts and only 10 walks. He was named NWL Pitcher of the Year.

== Rafters in MLB ==
The following is a list of former Wisconsin Rapids Rafters to have appeared in Major League Baseball.

Name	MLB teams played for	Years with Rafters	MLB Debut	MLB accolades
Ben Heller	Yankees, Braves, Pirates	2012	August 26, 2016	
J. P. Feyereisen	Brewers, Rays, Dodgers, Diamondbacks	2012–2013	July 24, 2020	
Ernie Clement	Indians/Guardians, A's, Blue Jays	2015	June 13, 2021	All-Star (2026)
Bryson Stott	Phillies	2017	April 8, 2022	
Zach Jackson	A's	2014	April 9, 2022	
Richie Palacios	Guardians, Cardinals, Rays	2016	April 25, 2022	
Jonah Bride	A's, Marlins, Twins, Rangers	2015	June 14, 2022	
Cole Waites	Giants	2018	September 13, 2022	
Nick Avila	Giants	2017	April 1, 2024	
Spencer Arrighetti	Astros, Blue Jays	2020	April 10, 2024	AL Pitcher of the Month (May 2026)
Kyle Teel	White Sox	2020–2021	June 6, 2025	
Travis Adams	Twins	2020	July 5, 2025	
Hayden Harris	Braves	2021	September 2, 2025	
Ben Ross	Twins	2022	September 1, 2026	
Jack Sinclair	Nationals	2019	September 4, 2026	
