= Herr-Baker Field =

Baseball venue in Fond du Lac, Wisconsin

- Location within Wisconsin Herr-Baker Field (the United States)
- Interactive map of Herr-Baker Field
- Address: 980 E. Division St. Fond du Lac, Wisconsin
- Coordinates: 43.777381°N 88.408856°W
- Owner: Marian University
- Capacity: 2,000

Construction
- Renovated: 2016–2017
- General contractor: CR Structures Group (2016–2017)

Tenants
- Fond du Lac Dock Spiders (NWL) 2017–present Marian University Sabres (NCAA Division III); St. Mary's Springs Ledgers (WIAA)

Herr-Baker Field is a baseball stadium in Fond du Lac, Wisconsin. The stadium is home to the Fond du Lac Dock Spiders, a collegiate summer baseball team of the Northwoods League, the Marian University men's baseball team, and St. Mary's Springs Academy boy's high school baseball team.
