= 2014 Northwoods League season =

21st annual season of the Northwoods League

- League: Northwoods League
- Sport: Baseball
- Teams: 18

Northwoods League Championship
- Champions: Lakeshore Chinooks
- Runners-up: Mankato MoonDogs

Seasons
- ← 2013 2015 →

The 2014 Northwoods League season was the 21st season of baseball in the Northwoods League, a collegiate summer baseball organization. The season concluded in August with the Lakeshore Chinooks winning the championship.

== Season overview ==
=== Background ===
After the 2013 season, the Northwoods League (NWL) expanded from 16 to 18 teams. The Kalamazoo Growlers were added, bringing the total of Michigan-based teams to two; with the other at the time being the Battle Creek Bombers.

The Kenosha Kingfish were also added. The NWL had previously been in the Wisconsin city in the form of the Kenosha Kroakers, a charter member of the league. In the run-up to the 2014 season, historic Simmons Field received extensive renovations.

To accommodate two new teams on the eastern side of the league's geographic footprint, the Eau Claire Express shifted to the North Division, competing against divisional opponents in Minnesota, Iowa, and Ontario.

In the 2014 season, the NWL had eighteen teams, split evenly between a North and South Division. The Madison Mallards entered the season as defending champions, having defeated the Duluth Huskies in the 2013 NWL championship series.

=== Season ===
The regular season began in May, with the season split into two halves. The teams with the best records in the division for each half automatically qualified for a playoff berth. This resulted in four teams qualifying for the playoffs.

The playoff qualifiers for each division were as follows:

- North Division - Mankato MoonDogs, Willmar Stingers
- South Division - Lakeshore Chinooks, Wisconsin Woodchucks

In the two best-of-two semifinal playoff games, the MoonDogs beat the Stingers and the Chinooks beat the Woodchucks. The championship series was a best-of-three set between the Chinooks and the MoonDogs. The Chinooks swept the MoonDogs and claimed their first NWL title.

=== Individual achievements ===
Pete Alonso of the Madison Mallards was named 2014 NWL Most Valuable Player. Alonso played in 59 games for the Mallards after his freshman year at Florida. He maintained a .354 batting average and led the league in slugging percentage (.624) and OPS (1.043). He tallied 80 hits, 18 home runs, and 53 RBI.

Matt Kent of the Rochester Honkers and Ryan Smoyer of the Kalamazoo Growlers were named co-recipients of the 2014 NWL Pitcher of the Year award. Kent logged 77.2 innings pitched and maintained a 2.09 ERA with 69 strikeouts. Smoyer pitched a league-high 80.2 innings, holding a 2.01 ERA and striking out 43 batters.

In the 2014 Major League Baseball draft, 175 former NWL players were selected by MLB teams. Nick Howard was the highest-selected alum, going to the Cincinnati Reds with the 19th pick. Howard had played for the Madison Mallards in 2012. The very next pick, #20, the Tampa Bay Rays selected Casey Gillaspie. Gillaspie had played with Eau Claire in 2012.

Future MLB standout Matt Chapman was taken by the Oakland Athletics with the 25th pick. Chapman had played for La Crosse in 2012. Other notable alums selected that year include Derek Fisher (Mallards, '12), Brian Anderson (Chinooks, '12), and Jose Trevino (Mallards, '12).

== Standings ==
North Division
| Pos | Team | W | L | Pct. |
|---|---|---|---|---|
| 1 | x – Willmar Stingers | 46 | 26 | .639 |
| 2 | Waterloo Bucks | 45 | 27 | .625 |
| 3 | x – Mankato MoonDogs | 42 | 30 | .583 |
| 4 | Rochester Honkers | 37 | 35 | .514 |
| 5 | St. Cloud Rox | 37 | 35 | .514 |
| 6 | Eau Claire Express | 36 | 36 | .500 |
| 7 | Duluth Huskies | 30 | 42 | .417 |
| 8 | Thunder Bay Border Cats | 23 | 49 | .319 |
| 9 | Alexandria Blue Anchors | 22 | 50 | .306 |

South Division
| Pos | Team | W | L | Pct. |
|---|---|---|---|---|
| 1 | x – Lakeshore Chinooks | 50 | 21 | .704 |
| 2 | x – Wisconsin Woodchucks | 42 | 30 | .583 |
| 3 | Kenosha Kingfish | 41 | 30 | .577 |
| 4 | Madison Mallards | 39 | 33 | .542 |
| 5 | Green Bay Bullfrogs | 36 | 36 | .500 |
| 6 | La Crosse Loggers | 33 | 39 | .458 |
| 7 | Battle Creek Bombers | 32 | 40 | .444 |
| 8 | Kalamazoo Growlers | 29 | 43 | .403 |
| 9 | Wisconsin Rapids Rafters | 27 | 45 | .375 |

- x – Qualified for playoffs based on either best record (first or second half of season) or as a wildcard due to overall record.

== Statistical leaders ==
Qualified hitters must have minimum of 71 at-bats per season.

=== Hitting ===
| Stat | Player | Team | Total |
|---|---|---|---|
| H | Tyler Sullivan | MoonDogs | 90 |
| HR | Pete Alonso | Mallards | 18 |
| RBI | Pat Porter | Kingfish | 63 |
| AVG | Connor Marabell | Mallards | .384 |
| OPS | Pete Alonso | Mallards | 1.043 |
| SB | Tyler Sullivan | MoonDogs | 36 |

=== Pitching ===
| Stat | Player | Team | Total |
|---|---|---|---|
| W | Ryan Smoyer | Growlers | 8 |
| SO | Reese Gregory | Rox | 71 |
| SV | Steve Villines | Huskies | 8 |

== All-Star selections ==
=== Post-season All-Star Team ===
After the 2014 season, the NWL announced its Post-Season All-Star Team, recognizing standout players for their contributions over the course of the season. The following players were named as full-season all-stars.

North Division

Hitters
| Position | Player | Team |
|---|---|---|
| C | Daniel Salters | Express |
| 1B | Nick Rivera | Stingers |
| 2B | Chris Paul | Rox |
| 3B | Tyler Hermann | Express |
| SS | Peter Maris | MoonDogs |
| OF | Tyler Sullivan | MoonDogs |
| OF | Jon McAllister | Bucks |
| OF | Jordan Lee | Blue Anchors |
| DH | Levi Scott | MoonDogs |
| DH | Pat MacKenzie | Bucks |

Pitchers
| Position | Player | Team |
|---|---|---|
| P | Alex Winkelman | Huskies |
| P | Tyler Mark | MoonDogs |
| P | Matt Kent | Honkers |
| P | Reese Gregory | Rox |
| P | Adam Bray | Bucks |
| P | Brady Anderson | Stingers |

South Division

Hitters
| Position | Player | Team |
|---|---|---|
| C | Ryan Lidge | Growlers |
| 1B | Pete Alonso | Mallards |
| 2B | Chris Godinez | Kingfish |
| 3B | Paul DeJong | Woodchucks |
| SS | Zack Domingues | Rafters |
| OF | Pat Porter | Kingfish |
| OF | Troy Montgomery | Growlers |
| OF | Brett Siddall | Chinooks |
| DH | Zach Arnold | Woodchucks |

Pitchers
| Position | Player | Team |
|---|---|---|
| P | Rico Garcia | Kingfish |
| P | Andrew Elliot | Chinooks |
| P | Jake Tuttle | Chinooks |
| P | Tim Black | Mallards |
| P | Jacob Waguespack | Bombers |
| P | Ryan Smoyer | Growlers |

== NWL alumni in MLB ==
=== MLB players who played in the NWL in 2014 ===
The following is a list of players who appeared in the NWL during the 2014 season, en route to a future appearance/career in MLB.

| Name | 2014 NWL team(s) |
|---|---|
| Paul DeJong | Wisconsin Woodchucks |
| Kevin Kaczmarski | Waterloo Bucks |
| Pete Alonso | Madison Mallards |
| Jake Noll | Lakeshore Chinooks |
| Matt Beaty | Green Bay Bullfrogs |
| Shaun Anderson | Lakeshore Chinooks |
| Jacob Waguespack | Battle Creek Bombers |
| Josh Taylor | St. Cloud Rox |
| Sean Poppen | Duluth Huskies |
| Alex Young | Lakeshore Chinooks |
| Matt Thaiss | Madison Mallards |
| John Schreiber | Kalamazoo Growlers |
| AJ Puk | Waterloo Bucks |
| Rico Garcia | Kenosha Kingfish |
| Caleb Baragar | Kalamazoo Growlers |
| Sterling Sharp | Madison Mallards |
| Dane Dunning | Waterloo Bucks |
| Will Craig | St. Cloud Rox |
| Ka'ai Tom | Wisconsin Woodchucks |
| Jacob Robson | Thunder Bay Border Cats |
| Zach Jackson | Wisconsin Rapids Rafters |
| Steven Wilson | Eau Claire Express |
| Phoenix Sanders | Willmar Stingers |
| Tanner Tully | Battle Creek Bombers |
| Cody Sedlock | Waterloo Bucks |
| Cam Vieaux | Lakeshore Chinooks |
| Alex Call | Eau Claire Express |
| Nate Mondou | Wisconsin Woodchucks |
| Zach Muckenhirn | Alexandria Blue Anchors |
| Taylor Kohlwey | La Crosse Loggers, Wisconsin Woodchucks |
| Parker Dunshee | Wisconsin Woodchucks |
| Ryan Fitzgerald | Kenosha Kingfish |
| Brian Keller | La Crosse Loggers |

=== Alums with 2014 MLB debuts ===
The following is a list of NWL alums who made their Major League Baseball debuts in the 2014 MLB season.

| Name | MLB debut | Debut team | Former NWL team(s) | Season(s) in NWL |
|---|---|---|---|---|
| Aaron Barrett | 3/31 | Nationals | Huskies | 2008 |
| James Jones | 4/18 | Mariners | Bucks | 2008 |
| Greg Garcia | 4/28 | Cardinals | Blue Thunder | 2008 |
| Daniel Robertson | 4/29 | Rangers | Bullfrogs | 2007 |
| Blaine Hardy | 6/16 | Tigers | Border Cats | 2008 |
| Raffy Lopez | 9/2 | Cubs | Bombers, Mallards | 2007, 2010 |
| Xavier Scruggs | 9/4 | Cardinals | Blue Thunder | 2007 |

=== Awards and highlights ===
NWL alums selected the 2014 MLB All-Star Game:

- Pat Neshek (Wisconsin Woodchucks, 2000)
- Chris Sale (La Crosse Loggers, 2008)
- Max Scherzer (La Crosse Loggers, 2004)
- Jordan Zimmermann (Eau Claire Express, 2006)

NWL alums who were members of the World Series-winning San Francisco Giants:

- Brandon Crawford (Mankato MoonDogs, 2005)

== See also ==
- 2014 Major League Baseball season
