= Victor Scott II =

American baseball player (born 2001)

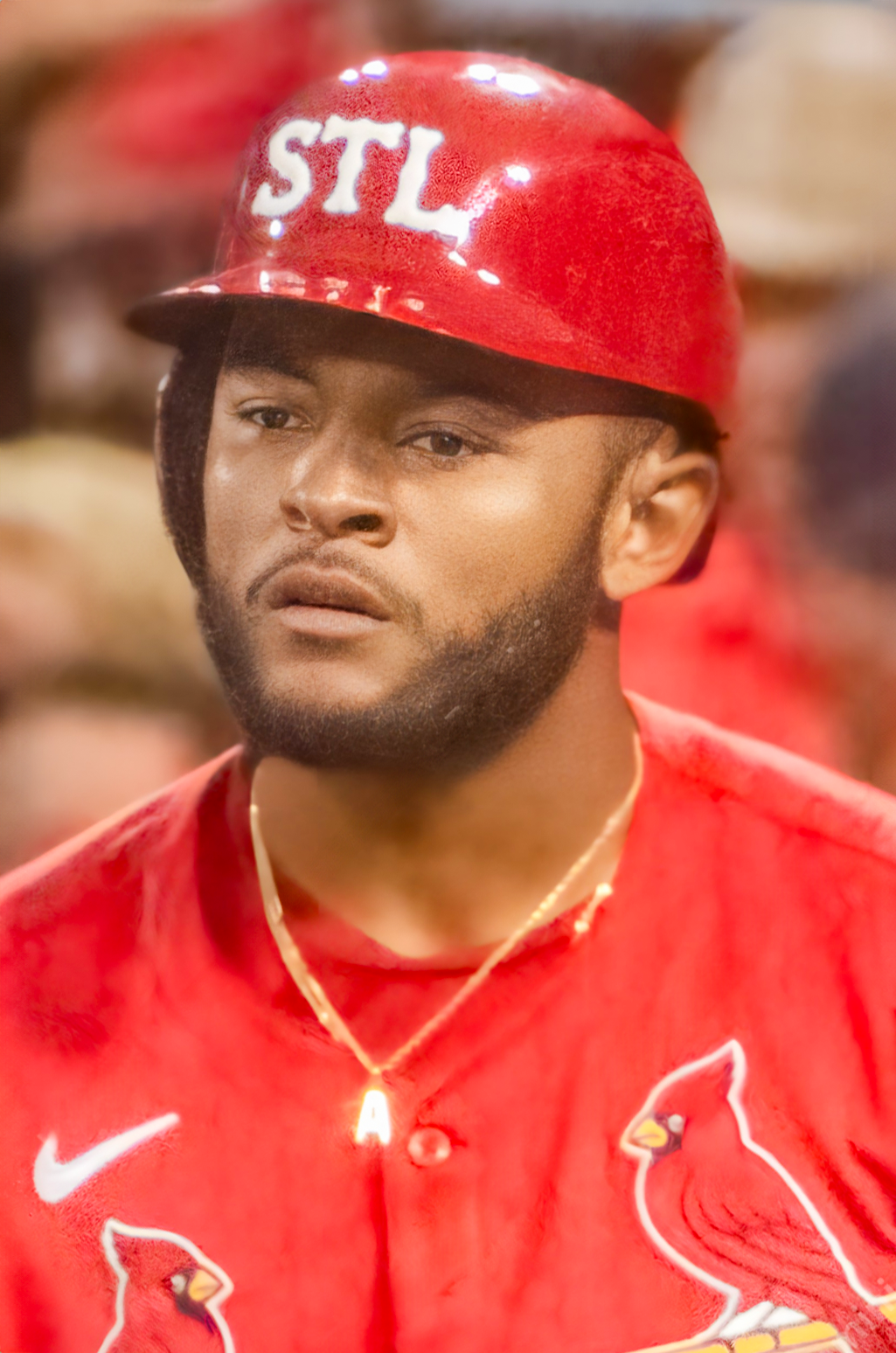
- Scott with the Cardinals in 2024

St. Louis Cardinals – No. 11
- Outfielder
- Born: February 12, 2001 (age 25); Atlanta, Georgia, U.S.
- Bats: Left Throws: Left

MLB debut
- March 28, 2024, for the St. Louis Cardinals

MLB statistics (through 2026 season)
- Batting average: .203
- Home runs: 9
- Runs batted in: 56
- Stats at Baseball Reference

Teams
- St. Louis Cardinals (2024–present)

Victor Dwanyne Scott II (born February 12, 2001) is an American professional baseball outfielder for the St. Louis Cardinals of Major League Baseball (MLB). He made his MLB debut in 2024.

== Amateur career ==
Scott attended McEachern High School in Powder Springs, Georgia, and West Virginia University, where he played college baseball for the West Virginia Mountaineers. In the summers of 2020 and 2021, he played summer league baseball for the Fond du Lac Dock Spiders of the Northwoods League. In 2022, he played with the Cotuit Kettleers of the Cape Cod Baseball League. As a redshirt junior at West Virginia in 2022, Scott played in 55 games and hit .278 with six home runs, 47 RBI, and 38 stolen bases.

== Professional career ==
=== Minor leagues ===
The St. Louis Cardinals selected Scott in the fifth round of the 2022 MLB draft. The Cardinals assigned Scott to the Palm Beach Cardinals of the Single–A Florida State League in 2022.

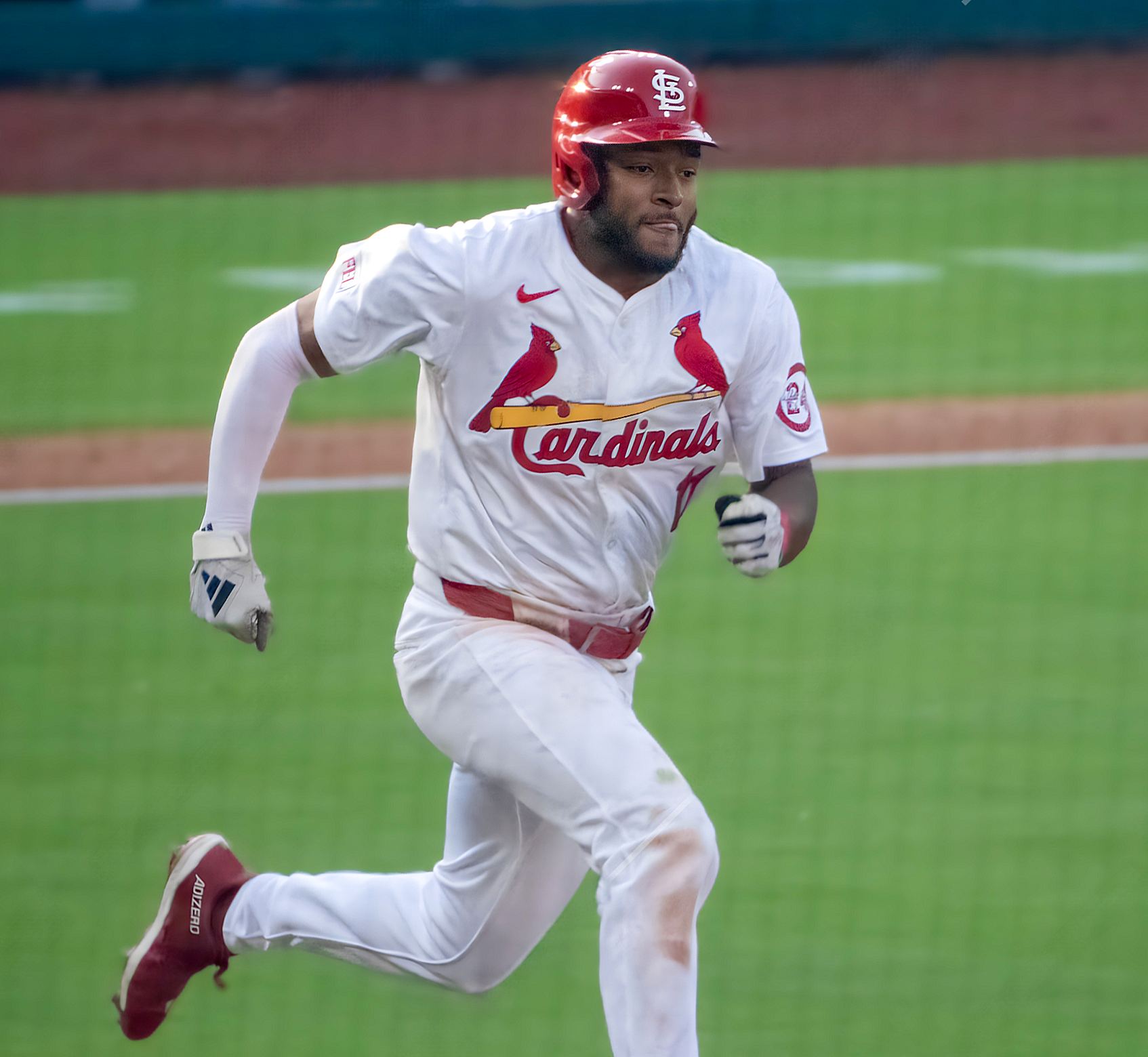
Scott with the Cardinals

Scott began the 2023 season with the Peoria Chiefs of the High-A Midwest League and was promoted to the Springfield Cardinals of the Double-A Texas League in June. Scott was chosen to represent the Cardinals at the 2023 All-Star Futures Game. He also played for the Scottsdale Scorpions of the Arizona Fall League. After the season, Scott won one of the three Rawlings Gold Glove Awards given out to the best defensive players in the minor leagues.

=== St. Louis Cardinals ===
Victor Scott II swipes Second. 2025.

The Cardinals invited Scott to spring training in 2024 as a non-roster player. After a shoulder injury to starting center fielder Dylan Carlson that put him on the injured list for a few weeks, Scott was selected to the team's Opening Day roster and was named the Cardinals starting center fielder on Opening Day. In his MLB debut, Scott went 0-for-3 with a stolen base at Dodger Stadium versus the Los Angeles Dodgers. He recorded his first MLB hit on March 31, an infield single off Dodgers starting pitcher Gavin Stone.

Scott batted 5-for-65 (.085) for the Cardinals before they optioned him to the Memphis Redbirds of the Triple–A International League on April 21. They recalled him on August 4. On August 6, he hit his first MLB home run, a two-run home run at Busch Stadium versus Jeffrey Springs of the Tampa Bay Rays. Scott was optioned and recalled twice more before the season's end. Over 53 games played with St. Louis, Scott hit .179 with two home runs, 10 RBI, nine doubles and five stolen bases. He played in 81 games with Memphis and batted .210 with six home runs.

Scott was named to the Cardinals' Opening Day roster for the 2025 season. He missed time during the season due to an ankle injury and was placed on the injured list. He spent the season as the team's starting center fielder, appearing in 138 games and hitting .216 with five home runs, 37 RBI, and 34 stolen bases. Scott was named a finalist for the National League Gold Glove Award in center field.

== Personal life ==
Scott's parents, Victor and Mary, ran track. His father is a member of the Morris Brown College Hall of Fame.
