= Kenosha Kingfish =

Baseball team based in Kenosha, Wisconsin

- Logo

Information
- League: Northwoods League (Great Lakes East 2019-present) (South Division 2013–2018))
- Location: Kenosha, Wisconsin
- Ballpark: Simmons Field
- Founded: 2013
- Division championships: 1 (2015)
- League championships: 1 (2015)
- Colors: Lake Michigan blue, cardinal red, king's gold, white, dark gold, vintage cream
- Ownership: Bill Fanning, Mike Zoellner
- Management: General Manager: Jake McGhee (2013–2016); Rich Marks (2016); Zac Pallissard (2017–2018); Scott Preimesberger (2018-2019); Doug Gole (2019-2020); Ryne Goralski (2020-Present)
- Manager: Aidan Wirshing
- Media: Play-By-Play Broadcaster: Dominick Liacone; Newspaper: Kenosha News
- Website: Official website

The Kenosha Kingfish are a baseball team that plays in the collegiate summer Northwoods League. Based in Kenosha, Wisconsin, the Kingfish play their home games at Simmons Field.

== History ==
=== Background ===
Prior to the establishment of the Kingfish, Simmons Field had been the home of multiple amateur and minor league baseball teams over the years, including the Kenosha Comets (AAGPBL), Kenosha Twins (Midwest League), and Kenosha Mammoths (Frontier League).

The city had previously been host to the Kenosha Kroakers, one of the five original Northwoods League (NWL) franchises, who played in the NWL from 1994-1998 and had several players go on to MLB careers, including Clint Barmes, George Sherrill, and Bobby Kielty.

After the announcement of the NWL's return to Kenosha, fans submitted suggestions for the team's name, and the winning suggestion of 'Kingfish' was revealed at the team's launch party on November 23, 2013.

=== 2014: Inaugural season ===
The Kingfish opened their inaugural 2014 season on the road, and played their first home series at the newly renovated Simmons Field on the weekend of May 31 and June 1. They finished the 2014 season with a 41–30 record in the Northwoods League South Division, narrowly missing the playoffs by half a game.

=== 2015: First championship ===
The Kingfish finished 2015 with a regular season record of 48–24. After beating the La Crosse Loggers 7–2 in Game 1 of the Divisional Playoffs and the Madison Mallards 2–1 in a close Game 2, the Kingfish defeated the St. Cloud Rox, in 2 games, to win their first Northwoods League Summer Collegiate World Series.

=== 2016: Hosting All-Star Game ===
2016 was notable in that the Kingfish hosted the NWL All Star Game and a Home Run Derby in which contestants hit home runs off a pier into Lake Michigan. Among those playing in the All-Star Game were Daulton Varsho, Caleb Boushley, and Mason McCoy. 2016 was also the Kingfish's highest attendance in a season.

=== 2020: Covid-19 Pod Season ===
Due to the COVID-19 pandemic, the Northwoods League created several hyper-regional "pod" divisions, many of which included new alternate identities of existing teams. The K-Town Bobbers joined the Kingfish in the Kenosha Division, with all games being played at Simmons Field. The Bobbers were not a new NWL franchise but rather a one-year alternate identity managed by the Kingfish. Future MLB All-Star Drake Baldwin suited up for the Bobbers. The season culminated in a victory by Kingfish in the "Battle of Kenosha."

== Alternate identities ==
The Kingfish have adopted numerous alternate identities for single-game promotions over the years.

=== Kenosha Keepers ===
For this promotion, the Kingfish temporarily adopted the name Kenosha Keepers in recognition of Kenosha’s lighthouses and lighthouse keepers.

=== Kenosha Kickers ===
The Kingfish hosted a Home Alone night, which they rebranded to the Kenosha Kickers, a scene from the movie, that included a jersey auction after the game.

=== Kenosha Twins ===
The Kenosha Twins were a Minor League Baseball team that played in Kenosha, from 1984 to 1992. They began playing in the Midwest League in 1984. The team played their home games at Simmons Field. The Twins won two championships, in 1985 and 1987, and were Northern Division champions for the first half of the 1988 season. In 2024, the Kingfish honored the 40th anniversary of the team moving to Kenosha with a jersey auction at the end of the game.

=== Kenosha Comets ===
The Kenosha Comets were a women's professional baseball team that played from 1943 through 1951 in the All-American Girls Professional Baseball League. They played their home games at Simmons Field. In 2023, they rebranded as the Comets wearing green jerseys with a white K in the middle and in the hats, a white K, for Kenosha.

== Mascot ==
King Elvis the First, an orange fish, is the mascot of the Kingfish. Before home games, he rides an ATV from the left field foul pole. He used to ride a zipline down the left field foul pole to deliver the ball for the first pitch. In 2022, Green Bay Packers player A. J. Dillon went viral for doing an oklahoma drill, knocking out Elvis’ head.

== Alumni in MLB ==
The following is a list of Kingfish and Bobbers players who have gone on to play in Major League Baseball.

Name	MLB teams played for	Years with Kenosha	MLB Debut
Rico Garcia	Colorado Rockies, San Francisco Giants, Baltimore Orioles, Oakland Athletics, Washington Nationals, New York Mets, New York Yankees	2014–2015	August 27, 2019
Brett Harris	Oakland Athletics / Athletics, Boston Red Sox	2020 (Bobbers)	May 3, 2024
Will Wagner	Toronto Blue Jays, San Diego Padres	2018	August 12, 2024
Drake Baldwin	Atlanta Braves	2020 (Bobbers)	March 27, 2025
Colton Gordon	Houston Astros, Milwaukee Brewers	2018-19	May 14, 2025
Ryan Fitzgerald	Minnesota Twins	2014	May 16, 2025
Carson McCusker	Minnesota Twins	2018	May 16, 2025

== Yearly attendance ==
Year	Attendance
2014	72,838
2015	82,019
2016	87,991
2017	86,291
2018	84,482
2019	83,176
2020	8,255
2021	67,529
2022	73,946
2023	82,350
2024	85,153
2025	86,341
2026	78,808
