= Spencer Schwellenbach =

American baseball player (born 2000)

Atlanta Braves – No. 56
- Pitcher
- Born: May 31, 2000 (age 26); Saginaw, Michigan, U.S.
- Bats: Right Throws: Right

MLB debut
- May 29, 2024, for the Atlanta Braves

MLB statistics (through 2025 season)
- Win–loss record: 15–11
- Earned run average: 3.23
- Strikeouts: 235
- Stats at Baseball Reference

Teams
- Atlanta Braves (2024–2025)

Spencer Drew Schwellenbach (born May 31, 2000) is an American professional baseball pitcher for the Atlanta Braves of Major League Baseball (MLB). He made his MLB debut in 2024.

== Amateur career ==
Schwellenbach grew up in Saginaw, Michigan, and attended Heritage High School, where he was a captain of both the baseball and soccer teams. He committed to play college baseball at Nebraska over offers from Michigan and Michigan State after his sophomore season. He was named the Michigan Gatorade Player of the Year and the state's Mr. Baseball as a senior after pitching to a 6–3 win–loss record with a 0.50 earned run average (ERA) and 88 strikeouts in 56 1/3 innings pitched while also hitting for a .367 batting average with 44 runs scored and 20 RBIs. Schwellenbach was selected in the 34th round of the 2018 Major League Baseball draft by the Cleveland Indians, but opted not to sign with the team.

As a true freshman, Schwellenbach started 44 of Nebraska's games and batted .275 with five home runs and 22 RBIs. He hit .295 in 15 games as a sophomore before the season was cut short due to the coronavirus pandemic. Following the season he played collegiate summer baseball for the Traverse City Pit Spitters of the Northwoods League, where he hit for a .356 average over 22 games. After only playing as a position player in his first two collegiate seasons, Schwellenbach was added as a relief pitcher. As a junior, he was named Big Ten Player of the Year and was a second team All-American by the Collegiate Baseball Newspaper. He was also named a semifinalist for the Golden Spikes Award. In the NCAA Fayetteville Regional of 2021 NCAA Division I baseball tournament, Schwellenbach pitched 4 2/3 innings of scoreless relief and drove in the game-tying run in a 5–3 win over Arkansas to force a deciding game 7. He was named the winner of the John Olerud Award as the nation's best two-way player after finishing the season with a .284 batting average and a .403 on-base percentage with six home runs and 40 RBIs while also posting a 3–1 record with ten saves and a 0.57 ERA over 18 pitching appearances.

== Professional career ==
The Atlanta Braves selected Schwellenbach in the second round, with the 59th overall pick, of the 2021 Major League Baseball draft. He signed with Atlanta on July 19, 2021, for a $1 million signing bonus. Shortly after signing, Schwellenbach underwent Tommy John surgery to repair the ulnar collateral ligament in his pitching elbow. He missed the entire 2022 season while rehabbing from surgery. Schwellenbach was assigned to the Single-A Augusta GreenJackets at the start of the 2023 season. He was selected to play in the 2023 All-Star Futures Game.

Schwellenbach split the beginning of the 2024 season with the High–A Rome Emperors and Double–A Mississippi Braves, accumulating a 1.80 ERA with 51 strikeouts across 8 starts. On May 29, 2024, Schwellenbach was selected to the 40-man roster and promoted to the major leagues for the first time. He made his MLB debut later that day against the Washington Nationals, yielding three earned runs on five hits in five innings and earning the loss. He finished the 2024 season with a 4–1 record, 2.42 ERA, pitched 48 1/3 innings, and struck out 47 batters in 7 starts in his rookie year.

On June 11, 2025, Schwellenbach pitched a complete game in a 6–2 win over the Milwaukee Brewers, allowing five hits and two runs while striking out 9 batters on 104 pitches. It was the first complete game of his career. On June 28, Schwellenbach reached a career-high in a single game with 12 strikeouts against the Philadelphia Phillies, where he pitched seven innings and allowing three hits and one earned run in a 6–1 victory. On July 2, he was placed on the 15-day injured list with a fractured elbow, and not expected to pitch until September. The Braves transferred Schwellenbach to the 60-day IL on July 6.

On February 10, 2026, Schwellenbach was placed on the 60-day injured list due to inflammation in his right elbow. On February 18, Schwellenbach underwent surgery to remove bone spurs from the elbow. In August, Schwellenbach underwent a second surgery, causing him to miss the full 2026 season.

== Personal life ==
Schwellenbach's parents are Jay and Robin. He has two older brothers and one older sister. All three siblings played for the North Saginaw Township Little League.

Schwellenbach and his wife Shelby first met while he played in Little League.
