= Seth Halvorsen =

American baseball player (born 2000)

Los Angeles Dodgers – No. 56
- Pitcher
- Born: February 18, 2000 (age 26); Chicago, Illinois, U.S.
- Bats: Right Throws: Right

MLB debut
- August 30, 2024, for the Colorado Rockies

MLB statistics (through 2026 season)
- Win–loss record: 4–5
- Earned run average: 4.78
- Strikeouts: 72
- Stats at Baseball Reference

Teams
- Colorado Rockies (2024–2026); Los Angeles Dodgers (2026)

Seth Michael Halvorsen (born February 18, 2000) is an American professional baseball pitcher for the Los Angeles Dodgers of Major League Baseball (MLB). He has previously played in MLB for the Colorado Rockies, with whom he debuted in 2024.

== Amateur career ==
Halvorsen grew up in Plymouth, Minnesota and attended Heritage Christian Academy in Maple Grove, Minnesota. He was the Minnesota Gatorade Player of the Year and a Rawlings high school All-American in 2018. He was a two-way player and threw a 16-strikeout shutout while hitting two home runs in the 1A state championship game. He was selected in the 30th round of the 2018 MLB draft by the Minnesota Twins but did not sign.

Halvorsen enrolled at the University of Missouri, where he played college baseball for the Missouri Tigers. After appearing in 4 games in 2019, he was shut down and had Tommy John surgery. He returned in 2020 as a center fielder, playing in 14 games. In summer 2020, he played for the Great Lakes Resorters, a temporary Covid-19 pod team in the Northwoods League based in Traverse City, Michigan.

Halvorsen resumed pitching in 2021 and led the Tigers with 4 wins, 70 strikeouts, and 72 innings pitched. That summer, the Philadelphia Phillies selected him in the 19th round of the 2021 MLB draft. He did not sign. He played collegiate summer baseball with the Hyannis Harbor Hawks of the Cape Cod Baseball League.

Halvorsen then transferred to play for the Tennessee Volunteers but missed all of 2022 after fracturing his elbow. He returned as a reliever in 2023, going 3–3 with 2 saves, a 3.81 ERA and 52 strikeouts in 52 innings.

== Professional career ==
=== Colorado Rockies ===
The Colorado Rockies selected Halvorsen in the seventh round of the 2023 MLB draft and he signed with the team. He split his first professional season between the rookie-level Arizona Complex League Rockies, High+A Spokane Indians, and Double-A Hartford Yard Goats. In 13 appearances for the three affiliates, he had a 2–0 record, 2.70 ERA, and 13 strikeouts across 13 1/3 innings pitched.

Halvorsen began the 2024 season in Double-A and earned a promotion to the Triple-A Albuquerque Isotopes in early August. In 41 minor league appearances out of the bullpen, he had a 5–2 record, 4.47 ERA, and 56 strikeouts in 44 1/3 innings pitched.

On August 30, Halvorsen was added to the 40-man roster and promoted to the major leagues for the first time. That night, he became the first Rockies pitcher to throw only one pitch and get an out in his MLB debut, inducing a Gunnar Henderson groundout. He earned his first win on September 12 against the Detroit Tigers. On September 21, he earned his first career save, tossing a scoreless inning against the Los Angeles Dodgers. He ended his first MLB season with a 2–1 record, two saves, and a 1.46 ERA.

Halvorsen threw a 103.3-mile-per-hour (166.2 km/h) fastball on July 3, 2025, the fastest pitch by a Colorado pitcher since at least 2015. His fastball averaged 100 miles per hour (160 km/h), the third fastest of any major league pitcher who faced at least 100 batters. He was 1–2 with 11 saves in 42 games in his rookie season with Colorado. His season ended in early August after he went on the injured list with a right elbow strain.

Halvorsen was optioned to Triple-A Albuquerque to begin the 2026 season.

=== Los Angeles Dodgers ===
On July 20, 2026, Halvorsen was traded to the Los Angeles Dodgers in exchange for Nick Frasso and Landyn Vidourek. He pitched 10 innings across 11 games for the Dodgers, allowing nine runs on 11 hits (8.10 ERA).

On November 18, 2026, the Dodgers announced that Halvorsen would require Tommy John surgery on his pitching elbow and miss the entirety of the 2027 season.

== Personal life ==
Halvorsen has three siblings. He graduated from the University of Tennessee with a bachelor's degree in hospitality and tourism management in 2023.
