= Spencer Arrighetti =

American baseball player (born 2000)

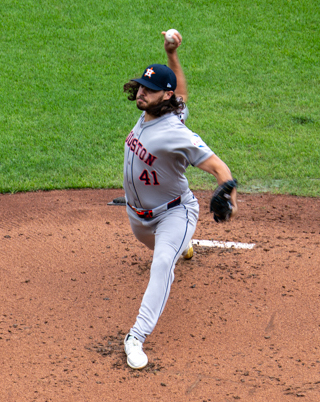
- Arrighetti with the Houston Astros in 2025

Toronto Blue Jays – No. 45
- Pitcher
- Born: January 2, 2000 (age 26); Albuquerque, New Mexico, U.S.
- Bats: Right Throws: Right

MLB debut
- April 10, 2024, for the Houston Astros

MLB statistics (through 2026 season)
- Win–loss record: 17–27
- Earned run average: 4.79
- Strikeouts: 308
- Stats at Baseball Reference

Teams
- Houston Astros (2024–2026); Toronto Blue Jays (2026–present)

Spencer Zane Arrighetti (born January 2, 2000) is an American professional baseball pitcher for the Toronto Blue Jays of Major League Baseball (MLB). He made his MLB debut in 2024 with the Houston Astros.

== Amateur career ==
Arrighetti attended Cinco Ranch High School in Katy, Texas, and played college baseball at TCU, Navarro College, and Louisiana. As a freshman at TCU, Arrighetti made 16 appearances (1 start), striking out 19 batters across 17 innings pitched, in which he gave up 17 earned runs for a 9.00 ERA. In 2020, Arrighetti transferred to Navarro College, where he made four starts, pitching to a 2–2 win-loss record and 4.26 earned run average (ERA) with 30 strikeouts. That same year, he played collegiate summer baseball for the Wisconsin Rapids Rafters of the Northwoods League.

As a junior, Arrighetti transferred to the University of Louisiana at Lafayette. In 2021, he led the Ragin' Cajuns with 83.2 innings pitched, posting a 7–6 record with a 3.12 ERA and a team-high 91 strikeouts.

== Professional career ==
=== Draft and minor leagues ===
Arrighetti was drafted by the Houston Astros in the sixth round of the 2021 Major League Baseball draft. He made his professional debut that same year with the Rookie-level Florida Complex League Astros before being promoted to the Single-A Fayetteville Woodpeckers.

Arrighetti started 2022 with the High-A Asheville Tourists before his promotion to the Double-A Corpus Christi Hooks. Between the two clubs, he made 27 appearances (17 starts), posting a 7–6 record with a 4.73 ERA and 152 strikeouts over 106^{2}/_{3} innings. Arrighetti split the 2023 season between the Double-A Corpus Christi Hooks and the Triple-A Sugar Land Space Cowboys. Following the season, Arrighetti was named the Houston Astros' 2023 Minor League Pitcher of the Year.

=== Houston Astros ===
==== Rookie year: 2024 ====
Arrighetti began the 2024 season with Triple-A Sugar Land where he made two starts, posting a 2.16 ERA in 8^{1}/_{3} innings. The Astros promoted him to the major leagues on April 10, 2024, and he made his major league debut that night. He allowed seven runs across three innings and struck out three batters against the Kansas City Royals. He achieved his first major league win on May 13, 2024, after allowing two runs over five innings to the Oakland Athletics in a 9–2 final. Arrighetti recorded 10 strikeouts in a major league game for the first time on June 26 in a 7–1 victory over the Colorado Rockies.

On August 4, 2024, Arrighetti struck out 12 batters in the 1–0 loss to the Tampa Bay Rays. In his next start, against the Boston Red Sox, he struck out a career-high 13 batters across seven innings in the 5–4 win. Those performances made Arrighetti the first rookie in American League (AL) history to strike out 12 batters each in consecutive starts. On August 28, Arrighetti took a no-hitter into seventh inning versus the Philadelphia Phillies, and had a career-high 7 2/3 shutout innings with 11 strikeouts to lead a 10–0 win. For the month of August, he posted a 1.95 ERA, 0.90 walks plus hits per inning pitched (WHIP), and 47 strikeouts over 32 1/3 innings, thus being recognized as AL Rookie of the Month.

In a contest versus the San Diego Padres on September 16, 2024, Arrighetti retired prospective 3-time batting champion Luis Arráez on a strikeout for the first time in 141 plate appearances, the longest such streak in the major leagues since Juan Pierre resisted 147 in 2004.

During Arrighetti's rookie campaign, his efforts evolved into an integral piece of the Astros' starting rotation, during which he pitched 29 appearances, starting 28 and produced a 4.53 ERA, 7–13 W–L, and 171 strikeouts over 145 innings. His 13 losses were sixth-most in the AL and 65 BB were 7th-most. Following the regular season, he was named the Houston Astros Rookie of the Year by the Houston chapter of the Baseball Writers' Association of America (BBWAA).

==== 2025 ====
On April 8, 2025, Arrighetti sustained a right thumb fracture after being hit by a batted ball during pre-game workouts at T-Mobile Park, and was placed on the 15-day injured list (IL). He was transferred to the 60-day injured list on June 14. Arrighetti was activated from the injured list on August 6.

==== 2026 ====
Arrighetti was optioned to Triple-A Sugar Land to begin the 2026 season. On April 15, the Astros recalled Arrighetti to the major league roster. On May 15, Arrighetti took a no-hit bid into the eighth inning with one out until Justin Foscue lined a single; Arrighetti combined with Bryan King for a one-hit, 2–0, shutout of the Texas Rangers. During the month of May, Arrighetti worked to a 4–1 win–loss record (W–L) and 0.93 ERA over five starts and 29 innings pitched (IP). He struck out 22 and surrendered 17 walks, a 1.138 walks plus hits per inning pitched (WHIP), two extra-base hits, .165 batting average against, and .517 OPS. He was recognized as AL Pitcher of the Month for the first time. Arrighetti made 17 starts for Houston in 2026, posting a 7–5 record and 4.60 ERA with 87 strikeouts across 88 innings pitched.

=== Toronto Blue Jays ===
On August 3, 2026, the Astros traded Arrighetti to the Toronto Blue Jays in exchange for Daulton Varsho.

Awards
Preceded by José Soriano	American League Pitcher of the Month; May 2026	Succeeded by Drew Rasmussen
