= Joe Boyle (baseball) =

American baseball player (born 1999)

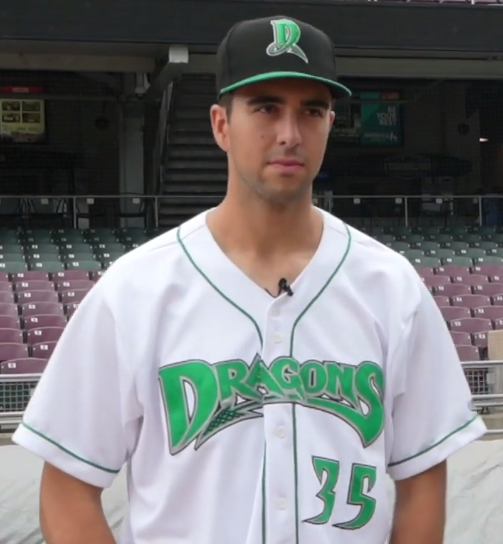
- Boyle with the Dayton Dragons in 2022

Tampa Bay Rays – No. 36
- Pitcher
- Born: August 14, 1999 (age 27); Philadelphia, Pennsylvania, U.S.
- Bats: Right Throws: Right

MLB debut
- September 17, 2023, for the Oakland Athletics

MLB statistics (through 2026 season)
- Win–loss record: 6–11
- Earned run average: 5.01
- Strikeouts: 150
- Stats at Baseball Reference

Teams
- Oakland Athletics (2023–2024); Tampa Bay Rays (2025–present)

Joseph Patrick Boyle (born August 14, 1999) is an American professional baseball pitcher for the Tampa Bay Rays of Major League Baseball (MLB). He has previously played in MLB for the Oakland Athletics.

Boyle played college baseball for the Notre Dame Fighting Irish, then was drafted by the Cincinnati Reds in 2020. He was traded to Oakland in 2023, making his MLB debut as a September call-up. He was traded to Tampa Bay after the 2024 season.

== Amateur career ==
Boyle spent seven years living in the St. Louis metropolitan area and originally attended Fort Zumwalt West High School in O'Fallon, Missouri. He graduated from North Oldham High School in Goshen, Kentucky, where he played baseball. As a senior in 2017, he earned All-State honors. He opted out of the 2017 MLB draft, and enrolled at the University of Notre Dame to play college baseball.

As a freshman for the Notre Dame Fighting Irish in 2018, Boyle pitched two innings, giving up four earned runs and eight walks. That summer, he played in the Northwoods League for the Kalamazoo Growlers. He also briefly played in the Cape Cod Baseball League for the Cotuit Kettleers. In 2019, as a sophomore, Boyle made 18 relief appearances and went 3–3 with a 5.96 earned run average (ERA), 39 strikeouts, and 27 walks over 25 2/3 innings. After the season, he returned to the Cape Cod League, pitching for the Harwich Mariners ,where he had a 2.14 ERA and 39 strikeouts over 21 innings and was named a league all-star. Boyle pitched 8 1/3 innings for the 2020 season in which he posted a 3.24 ERA with 17 strikeouts and 13 walks before the season was cancelled due to the COVID-19 pandemic.

== Professional career ==
=== Cincinnati Reds ===
The Cincinnati Reds selected Boyle in the fifth round, with the 143rd overall selection, of the 2020 MLB draft. Boyle signed with the Reds, but did not play in a game in 2020 due to the cancellation of the minor league season because of the COVID-19 pandemic. He made his professional debut in 2021 with the Single-A Daytona Tortugas, posting a 3.55 ERA over 12 2/3 innings while missing time due to injury. Boyle opened the 2022 season with the High-A Dayton Dragons. He was named the Midwest League Pitcher of the Month for May. In early August, Boyle was promoted to the Double-A Chattanooga Lookouts. Over 23 games (22 starts) between both teams, he went 3–6 with a 2.86 ERA, 153 strikeouts, and 84 walks over 100 2/3 innings. He returned to Chattanooga to open the 2023 season. In 19 games with Chattanooga, Boyle went 6–5 with a 4.50 ERA, 122 strikeouts, and 75 walks across 84 innings.

=== Oakland Athletics ===
On July 31, 2023, Boyle was traded to the Oakland Athletics in exchange for reliever Sam Moll. Boyle posted a 2–1 record and 2.08 ERA over three starts for the Double-A Midland RockHounds before he was promoted to the Triple-A Las Vegas Aviators. In three starts for Las Vegas, he recorded a 2.25 ERA with 18 strikeouts in 16 innings pitched.

On September 17, 2023, the Athletics selected Boyle's contract to the 40-man roster and promoted him to the major leagues for the first time. He made his MLB debut as Oakland's starting pitcher that night at the Oakland Coliseum, facing the San Diego Padres. He threw three scoreless innings, struck out four, and walked two in a 10–1 Athletics loss. Boyle pitched 16 innings for the Athletics and had a 2–0 record, a 1.69 ERA, and 15 strikeouts.

Boyle was named the fifth starter for the Athletics prior to the start of the 2024 season. In his first start, he lasted 2 2/3 innings, giving up eight runs. The Oakland defense made five errors while he was on the mound. On May 6, he was placed on the injured list with a low back strain. He was activated on June 5 and then optioned to Las Vegas. Boyle was recalled by Oakland on August 13 before he was optioned back to Las Vegas on September 4, with whom he finished the 2024 season. Across 13 games (10 starts) for Oakland in 2024, Boyle struggled to a 3–6 record with a 6.42 ERA, 56 strikeouts, and 40 walks in 47 2/3 innings pitched. With Las Vegas, he had a 1–3 record, 5.12 ERA, 71 strikeouts, and 39 walks over 45 2/3 innings.

=== Tampa Bay Rays ===
On December 14, 2024, the Athletics traded Boyle, Will Simpson, Jacob Watters, and a competitive balance round A pick in the 2025 MLB draft to the Tampa Bay Rays for pitchers Jeffrey Springs and Jacob Lopez. Boyle was optioned to the Triple-A Durham Bulls to begin the 2025 season. He split the season between Durham and Tampa Bay. Across 13 appearances (nine starts) for the Rays, Boyle went 1–4 with a 4.67 ERA and 58 strikeouts over 52 innings. Boyle made 17 starts for Durham and had a 1.88 ERA with 114 strikeouts across 86 innings. He was named an International League All-Star.

Boyle was optioned to Durham to begin the 2026 season. However, following an injury to Ryan Pepiot, Boyle was included as part of Tampa Bay's Opening Day roster. Boyle was placed on the injured list on April 11 with a right elbow strain. He was activated on May 18 and optioned to Durham. Boyle pitched a total of 19 innings for the Rays and had a 0–1 record with a 5.21 ERA and 21 strikeouts. With Durham, he appeared in 23 games (14 starts) with a 2–8 record, a 7.97 ERA, 91 strikeouts, and 52 walks across 66 2/3 innings.
