= Wausau Woodchucks =

Collegiate summer baseball team in Wisconsin

- Logo

Information
- League: Northwoods League (1994-present) (Great Lakes Conference-West Division: 2019-present) (South Division: 1998-2018)
- Location: Wausau, Wisconsin
- Ballpark: Athletic Park
- Founded: 1994
- Division championships: 2001; 2003
- League championships: 2001; 2003
- Former name: Wisconsin Woodchucks (1999–2021); Wausau Woodchucks (1994–1998)
- Colors: Navy, light blue, light green, brown, white
- Ownership: Mark Macdonald
- Management: Ryan Treu (GM)
- Media: Wausau Daily Herald
- Website: woodchucks.com

The Wausau Woodchucks are an American baseball team that plays in the Northwoods League, a collegiate summer baseball league. They play their home games at Athletic Park in Wausau, Wisconsin.

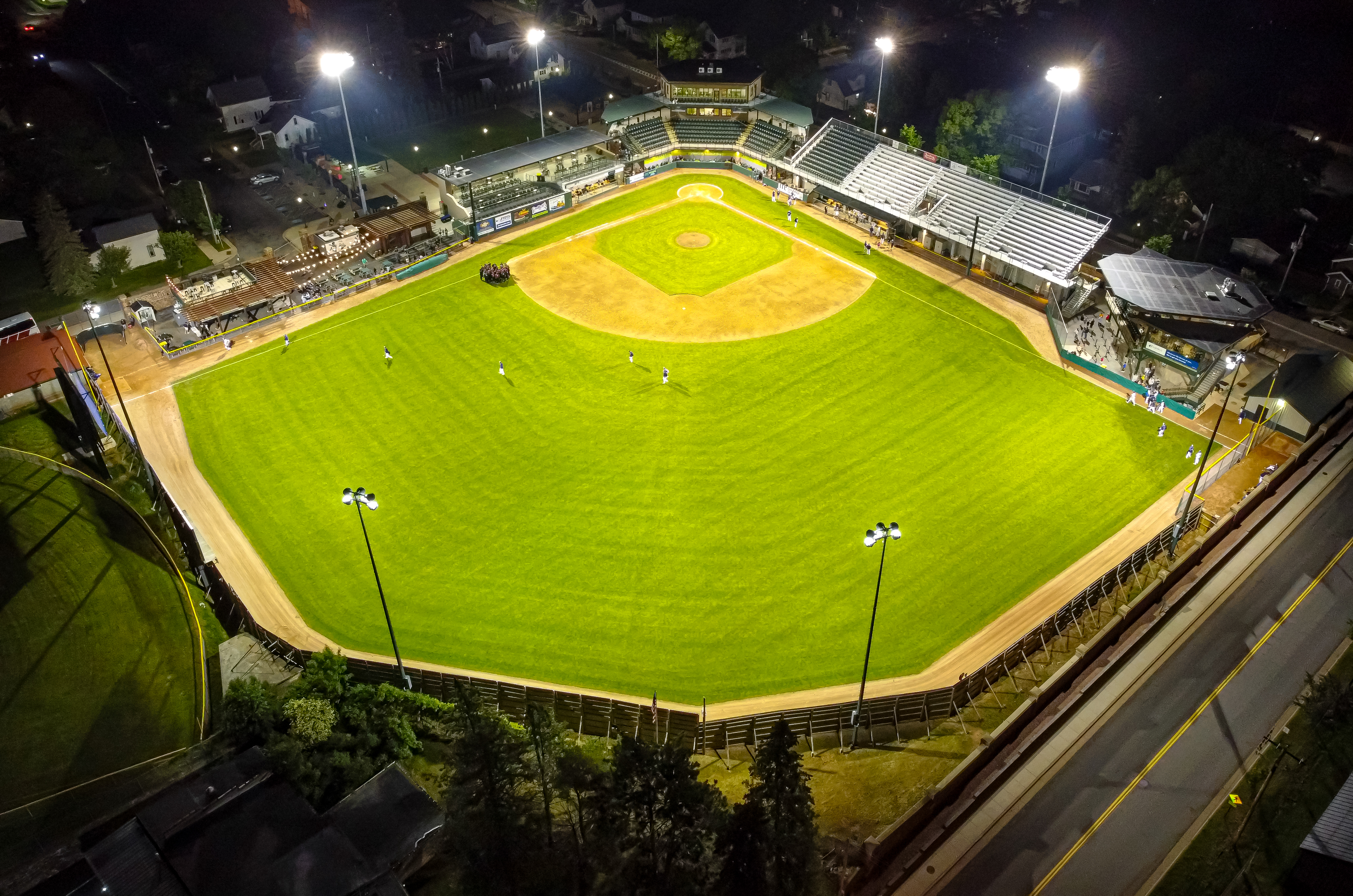
Athletic Park baseball field

== History ==
Athletic Park was previously occupied by the Wausau Timbers of the Class A Midwest League, who relocated after the 1990 season to Geneva, Illinois, to become the Kane County Cougars. The Timbers (and Wausau Mets before them) had hosted numerous future major leaguers including Edgar Martínez, Omar Vizquel, Harold Reynolds, and Mookie Wilson.

The Woodchucks began play in 1994 as one of the five original franchises in the Northwoods League, along with the Rochester Honkers, Manitowoc Skunks, Kenosha Kroakers, and Dubuque Mud Puppies. The Woodchucks are the only team among these five that has played continuously in its original city since the league's inception.

The team was known as the Wausau Woodchucks from 1994 to 1998, but the team name was changed to Wisconsin Woodchucks for the 1999 season, as they were the only remaining team in Wisconsin in the league at that time.

The Wisconsin Woodchucks won the Northwoods League championship twice, in 2001 and 2003. 2003 was a particularly notable season as Woodchucks team MVP was future MLB standout Ben Zobrist. Upon receiving the team’s MVP award, Zobrist reflected; “The Woodchucks have been good to me and given me so many opportunities. I’m excited to accept this award, not on behalf of my own achievement, but on behalf of everyone on the team.”

The Woodchucks' manager for the 2007–2009 seasons was Jim Gantner, a former Milwaukee Brewer who attended college at the University of Wisconsin–Oshkosh. Gantner had never managed a team previously, and the Woodchucks appealed to him as he had spent time in the area at a second home. Gantner became the team's president of baseball operations in 2009.

In 2022, the Woodchucks announced a return to their original team name—the Wausau Woodchucks—with a new logo and color scheme.

== Woodchucks in MLB ==
The following is a list of former Woodchucks to appear in Major League Baseball.

Name	Year(s) with Woodchucks	MLB accolades
Justin Berg	2003	
Lance Broadway	2004	
Jay Buente	2004/2005	
J. D. Davis	2012	
Paul DeJong	2014	All-Star
Zach DeLoach	2018	
Daniel Descalso	2006	World Series champion
Parker Dunshee	2014	
Jerad Eickhoff	2010	
Sam Freeman	2007	
Dave Gassner	1998	
Mike Gerber	2011	
LuJames Groover	2021	
Brent Headrick	2018	
Tyler Heineman	2011	
Casey Janssen	2001	
C. J. Kayfus	2021	
Taylor Kohlwey	2014/2015	
Bryan Lavastida	2018	
Nick Loftin	2018	
Mark Lowe	2002/2003	
Nate Mondou	2014	
Jon Moscot	2010	
Pat Neshek	2000	All-Star (2x)
Wes Obermueller	1998	
Jared Oliva	2014/2016	
Ethan Pecko	2023	
Kevin Pillar	2010	16.1 career bWAR
Chris Reed	2009	
Darin Ruf	2007	
Brock Stassi	2010	
Ka'ai Tom	2014	
Pat Venditte	2007	Namesake of Pat Venditte Rule
Steele Walker	2016	
Danny Young	2013	
Ben Zobrist	2003	All-Star (3x), World Series champion (2x), WS MVP
