= Battle Creek Battle Jacks =

Logo
Cap insignia

Information
- League: Northwoods League (Great Lakes)
- Location: Battle Creek, Michigan
- Ballpark: C. O. Brown Stadium
- Founded: 2007
- Post-season championships: 2011; 2017
- League championships: 2011
- Former name: Battle Creek Bombers (2007–2021)
- Colors: Light royal blue, black, silver, white, brown
- Ownership: Scott Miles
- Manager: Chris Fletcher
- Media: Battle Creek Enquirer
- Website: Official website

The Battle Creek Battle Jacks are a baseball team that plays in the Northwoods League, a collegiate summer baseball league. All players on the team must have NCAA eligibility remaining in order to participate. Their home games are played at MCCU Field in Battle Creek, Michigan.

The team was previously known as the Battle Creek Bombers from their inception in 2007 through 2021. Their new name refers variously to a previous Battle Creek baseball team, the Michigan Battle Cats, to Apple Jacks manufactured by Battle Creek-based Kellogg's, and to a "Jack of All Trades" as someone with multiple skills. Also, a "jack" is another term for a home run, and Cracker Jacks are often eaten by baseball fans during the game. Their new mascot is a Jack Russell terrier.

== Notable alumni ==
The following Battle Creek alums have gone on to appear in Major League Baseball.

- Ryan Dorow, 2016 Bombers, Texas Rangers
- Grant Hartwig, 2020 Bombers, New York Mets
- Raffy Lopez, 2007 Bombers, Chicago Cubs, Cincinnati Reds, Toronto Blue Jays, San Diego Padres
- Luke Murphy, 2020 Bombers, Los Angeles Angels
- Tony Sanchez, 2007 Bombers, Pittsburgh Pirates, Atlanta Braves
- Dave Sappelt, 2007 Bombers, Cincinnati Reds, Chicago Cubs
- Gavin Stone, 2019 Bombers, Los Angeles Dodgers
- Tanner Tully, 2014 Bombers, Cleveland Guardians
- Jacob Waguespack, 2014 Bombers, Toronto Blue Jays, Tampa Bay Rays, Detroit Tigers

Additionally, actor Tyler Hoechlin played for the Bombers while in college, missing a meeting with Francis Ford Coppola due to Northwoods League action.
