= Madison Mallards =

Collegiate summer baseball team based in Madison, Wisconsin, U.S.

Logo
Cap insignia

Information
- League: Northwoods League (Great Lakes West 2019–present) (South Division 2001–2018)
- Location: Madison, Wisconsin
- Ballpark: Warner Park
- Founded: 2001
- Division championships: 2004; 2005; 2008; 2013
- League championships: 2004; 2013
- Colors: Blue, gold, cream, black, dark gray, green, light yellow
- Ownership: Steve Schmitt
- Management: President: Vern Stenman; General Manager: Samantha Rubin
- Manager: Donnie Scott
- Media: Wisconsin State Journal; WOZN/WRIS-FM
- Website: www.mallardsbaseball.com

The Madison Mallards are a collegiate summer baseball team based in Madison, Wisconsin that plays in the Northwoods League. Warner Park on Madison's Northside is the team's home field.

== History ==
The history of minor league baseball in Madison begins with the early success of the Madison Muskies. A Midwest League Oakland A's affiliate, the Muskies were competitive and gained a healthy following in the years following their 1982 origins. By 1993 the crowds had declined and the Muskies became less profitable.

In 1994 the Muskies were replaced for a single season by the St Louis affiliate, Madison Hatters. 1996 began the five-year stint of the independent Madison Black Wolf, but once again low attendance and little interest plagued the team and they were forced to move to a more profitable community.

In 2001, area businessman Steve Schmitt introduced the Madison Mallards to Warner Park. The Mallards joined the Northwoods League, which features amateur college players playing summer ball during their off-season.

On October 17, 2019, the pro shop had significant damage done to it by a suspicious fire and the police investigated it as arson. There was an estimated $150,000 in damages.

=== Success ===
The Mallards made it to the playoffs in 2003, 2004, 2005, 2006, 2008, 2013, 2015, 2016, 2021, 2024, and 2026. They have made four Northwoods League Championship Series appearances, which resulted in runner-up finishes in 2005 and 2008. They won the Northwoods League championship in 2004 and 2013.

== Ownership ==
In 2014, the Mallards ownership group created Big Top Baseball. Big Top Baseball was a leader in summer collegiate baseball, operating four Northwoods League franchises in the state of Wisconsin at the time. Big Top Baseball owns and operates the Madison Mallards and Kenosha Kingfish and formerly owned the Wisconsin Rapids Rafters and Green Bay Bullfrogs, which were sold off during the COVID-19 pandemic.

== Stadium ==
The Mallards’ baseball diamond in Warner Park, built in 1982, currently seats 6,750 people.

=== Dimensions ===
The playing surface of the field is artificial turf infield with grass outfield, and the dimensions from home plate are 308 1/3 feet to left field, 380 feet to center field, and 290 2/3 feet to right field. The 440-square-foot scoreboard, installed in 2013, is located in left-center field. 14 flat-screen televisions can be found throughout the stadium. There is a children's playground and picnic seating close to the foul lines in left field.

=== Attendance ===
The Mallards routinely lead the nation in attendance among collegiate summer baseball teams, averaging over 6,308 fans per game in 2017 and 6,249 in 2018. In 2024, the Mallards had over 200,000 in attendance throughout the season.

=== Duck Blind ===
The club offers a promotion called the Duck Blind, a group of seats in right field that cost up to $41 and include unlimited food, soda, and beer. In 2018, the Duck Blind underwent a $1 million renovation.

== Alternate monikers ==
The Madison Mallards have adopted numerous monikers over the years, including:

=== Madison Muskallards ===
The "Muskallards" nickname is inspired by the myth of Bozho, who, according to the Madison Mallards, a Loch Ness-type monster located in Lake Mendota. The Muskallards logo is the same as the Mallards "M" logo, but instead of a Mallard tail, it now has the tail of a Muskie (hence the name "Muskallards", which is a combo of Muskies and Mallards). The colors of this rebrand consist of dark green, orange, and creme white.

=== Madison Old Fashioneds ===
The "Old Fashioneds" name is based on the Mallards attempt to build the World's Largest Brandy Old Fashioned Cocktail, which is part of their Wisconsin Day Celebration. The team decided to honor this by rebranding as the Old Fashioneds for Wisconsin Day. The logo consists of a cherry swinging a wooden bat. The colors are red and brown.

=== Madison Motivational Speakers ===
The "Motivational Speakers" nickname pays homage to Chris Farley, a Madison native who starred in the SNL "Van down by the river" skit. The logo consists of Chris Farley's character (Matt Foley) in a semi bent down pose with his right hand pointing to the right. He is also wearing his classic look in that logo. The Jersey consists of the classic look as well (white and blue plad overshirt, white polo undershirt and a green tie).

== Mallards in MLB ==
The following is a list of former Mallards to appear in Major League Baseball.

Name	Season(s) in Madison	MLB accolades
Pete Alonso	2014	5x All-Star, Rookie of the Year, 2x Silver Slugger
Drake Baldwin	2021	All-Star, Rookie of the Year
Danny Burawa	2009	
Jake Esch	2009-10	
Derek Fisher	2012	World Series Champion
Mike Gerber	2012	
Frank German	2016	
Tony Gonsolin	2015	All-Star, World Series Champion
Phil Gosselin	2008	
J.R. Graham	2009-10	
Taylor Gushue	2012	
Maverick Handley	2017	
John Hicks	2009	
Nico Hoerner	2016	2x Gold Glove Award
Joe McCarthy	2013	
Alec Mills	2012	No-hitter
Matt Pagnozzi	2002	
Bobby Poyner	2012	
Carson Ragsdale	2018	
Sterling Sharp	2014-15	
Ryan Spilborghs	2001	
Brock Stewart	2013	
Matt Thaiss	2014	
Justin Topa	2012	
Jose Trevino	2012	All-Star, Gold Glove Award
JJ Wetherholt	2022	
Matt Vierling	2016	

== Gallery ==
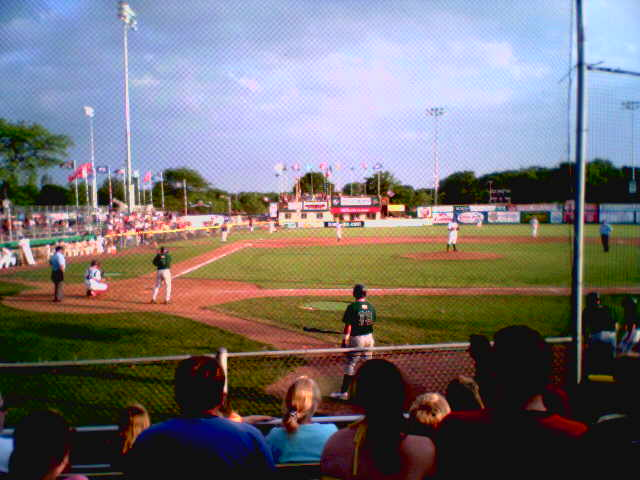

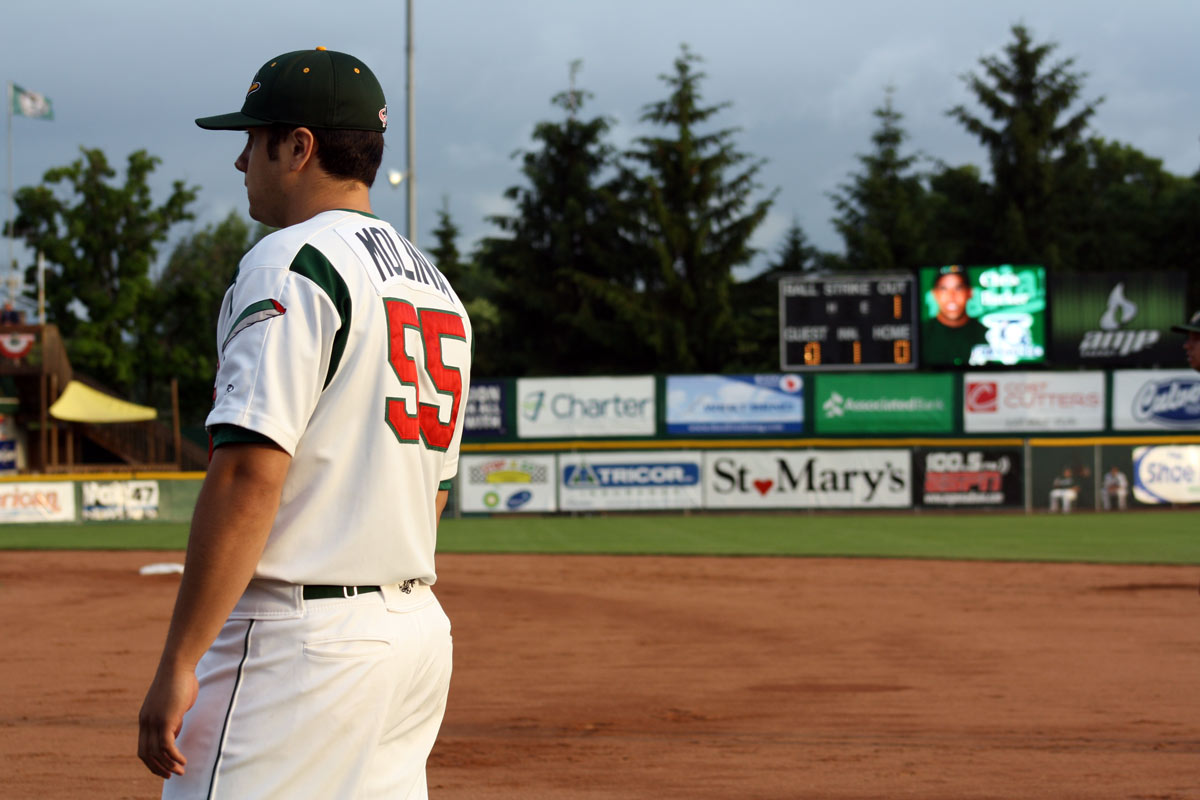

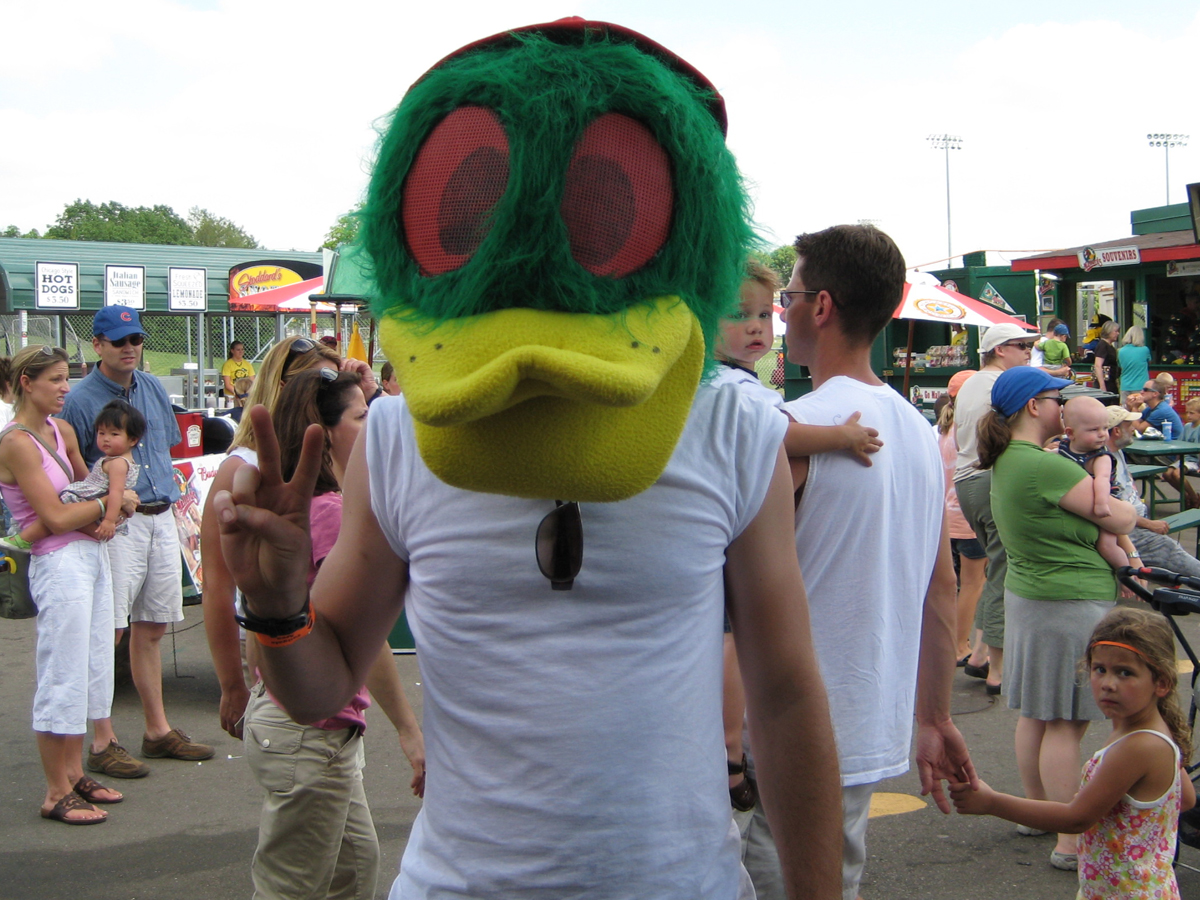
