= 2017 Northwoods League season =

American collegiate baseball season

- League: Northwoods League
- Sport: Baseball
- Teams: 20

Northwoods League Championship
- Champions: St. Cloud Rox
- Runners-up: Battle Creek Bombers

Seasons
- ← 2016 2018 →

The 2017 Northwoods League season was the 24th season of baseball in the Northwoods League, a collegiate summer baseball organization. The season concluded in August with the St. Cloud Rox winning the championship.

== Season overview ==
=== Background ===
Two expansion teams were added to the Northwoods League (NWL) after the 2016 season, the Bismarck Larks and Fond du Lac Dock Spiders. Bismarck was the first team the league had in North Dakota since the Grand Forks Channel Cats and Minot Greenheads folded after the 2000 season. The name and branding was unveiled before the season. Fond du Lac was a new market for the league, becoming the ninth Wisconsin-based team in the NWL. Their identity was also unveiled before the season.

In 2017, the NWL had twenty teams, split evenly between a North and South Division. The Wisconsin Rapids Rafters entered the season as defending champions, having defeated the Eau Claire Express in the 2016 NWL championship series.

=== Season ===
The regular season began in May, with the season split into two halves. The teams with the best records in the division for each half automatically qualified for a playoff berth, with two additional teams from each division added to the playoffs based on overall season record. This resulted in eight teams qualifying for the playoffs.

The playoff qualifiers for each division were as follows:

- North Division - St. Cloud Rox, Eau Claire Express, Mankato MoonDogs, Willmar Stingers
- South Division - Battle Creek Bombers, Lakeshore Chinooks, Rockford Rivets, Wisconsin Rapids Rafters

In the four single-elimination first round playoff games, the MoonDogs beat the Express, the Rox beat the Stingers, the Bombers beat the Rivets, and the Rafters beat the Chinooks. In the single-game divisional championship round, the Rox defeated the MoonDogs and the Bombers defeated the Rafters.

The championship series was a best-of-three set between the Rox and the Bombers. The deciding third game was at C.O. Brown Stadium in Battle Creek, Michigan. St. Cloud defeated Battle Creek 5-3 and claimed the 2017 NWL title.

=== Individual achievements ===
Zach Zubia of the Rochester Honkers was named 2017 NWL Most Valuable Player. In 67 games (301 plate appearances), Zubia led the league in home runs (22) and RBI (62).

Aaron Rozek of the St. Cloud Rox was named 2017 NWL Pitcher of the Year. He appeared in 10 games (64 innings) and led the league with 78 strikeouts.

Bryson Stott had an exceptional season for the Wisconsin Rapids Rafters, playing in the NWL at age 19 after his freshman year at UNLV. In 342 plate appearances across 71 games, Stott batted .352 with a league-leading 100 hits. He also added 26 stolen bases.

In the 2017 Major League Baseball draft, 180 former NWL players were selected by MLB teams. Greg Deichmann was the highest-selected alum, going to the Oakland Athletics with the 43rd pick. Deichmann had played for the Lakeshore Chinooks in 2015. Other notable alums drafted in 2017 include Daulton Varsho (Eau Claire, 2015–16) and Ernie Clement (Wisconsin Rapids, 2015).

== Standings and playoffs ==
North Division
Pos	Team	W	L	Pct.
1	x – Mankato MoonDogs	44	28	.611
2	x – St. Cloud Rox	42	30	.583
3	x – Willmar Stingers	41	31	.569
4	x – Eau Claire Express	39	33	.542
5	Waterloo Bucks	39	33	.542
6	Bismarck Larks	31	40	.437
7	La Crosse Loggers	31	40	.437
8	Rochester Honkers	30	39	.435
9	Duluth Huskies	31	41	.431
10	Thunder Bay Border Cats	27	43	.386

South Division
Pos	Team	W	L	Pct.
1	x – Wisconsin Rapids Rafters	52	20	.722
2	x – Battle Creek Bombers	42	30	.583
3	x – Rockford Rivets	39	33	.542
4	Fond du Lac Dock Spiders	38	34	.528
5	x – Lakeshore Chinooks	38	34	.528
6	Madison Mallards	38	34	.528
7	Kenosha Kingfish	36	36	.500
8	Kalamazoo Growlers	28	44	.389
9	Wisconsin Woodchucks	26	46	.361
10	Green Bay Bullfrogs	23	49	.319

- x – Qualified for playoffs based on either best record (first or second half of season) or as a wildcard due to overall record.

=== Playoff bracket ===
Wildcard round
Mankato
Eau Claire
St. Cloud
Willmar
↑ North Division ↓ South Division
Battle Creek
Rockford
Wisconsin Rapids
Lakeshore

Division Championship
St. Cloud
Mankato
Battle Creek
Wisconsin Rapids

League Championship series
St. Cloud
Battle Creek

== Statistical leaders ==
Qualified hitters must have minimum of 71 at-bats per season.

=== Hitting ===
Stat	Player	Team	Total
H	Bryson Stott	Rafters	100
HR	Zach Zubia	Honkers	22
RBI	Zach Zubia	Honkers	62
AVG	Toby Hanson	MoonDogs	.442
OPS	Toby Hanson	MoonDogs	1.132
SB	Matthew Mika	Chinooks	27

=== Pitching ===
Stat	Player	Team	Total
W	Jesse Slinger	Rafters	8
SO	Aaron Rozek	Rox	78
SV	Billy McKay	Kingfish	10

== All-Star selections ==
=== Mid-season All-Star Game ===
The 2017 NWL mid-season All-Star Game was played on 7/18/17 at Athletic Park in Wausau, Wisconsin. The following players were selected to participate in the All-Star game.

North Division

Hitters
Position	Player	Team
C	Jay Schuyler	Bucks
C	CJ Schaeffer	MoonDogs
1B	Zach Zubia	Honkers
2B	Ethan Valdez	MoonDogs
3B	David Villar	Loggers
3B	Nolan Bumstead	Stingers
SS	Camryn Williams	Huskies
SS	Andy Weber	Border Cats
OF	Marcus Still	Stingers
OF	Drew Avans	Rox
OF	Zach Gilles	Express
OF	Toby Hanson	MoonDogs
OF	Shane Selman	Rox
OF	Jake Pries	Huskies

Pitchers
Position	Player	Team
P	Polo Portella	Stingers
P	Kyle Leahy	Bucks
P	Aaron Rozek	Rox
P	Kevin Folman	Huskies
P	Tyler Steele	Larks
P	Victor Chavez	Express
P	Derik Beauprez	Loggers
P	Naithen Dewsnap	MoonDogs
P	Collin Floyd	MoonDogs
P	Brent Killam	Rox
P	Jack Cushing	Rox
P	Brandon Downey	Bucks
P	Gus Varland	Stingers

South Division

Hitters
Position	Player	Team
C	Nick Gatewood	Chinooks
C	Nick Zouras	Kingfish
C	Brad Hamilton	Bullfrogs
1B	JD Mundy	Bombers
1B	Derek Bangert	Kingfish
2B	Matthew Mika	Chinooks
3B	Jacob Richardson	Chinooks
SS	Alex Howard	Bombers
SS	Cole Daily	Mallards
OF	Dustin Woodcock	Rafters
OF	Stevie Mangrum	Woodchucks
OF	John Rave	Rivets
OF	Doran Turchin	Mallards
OF	Tom Stoffel	Bombers
OF	Jake Guenther	Rafters

Pitchers
Position	Player	Team
P	Trent Johnson	Bombers
P	Connor Johnson	Dock Spiders
P	Jon Mierzwa	Dock Spiders
P	Logan Wiley	Kingfish
P	Quinn Snarskis	Kingfish
P	Parker Sanburn	Chinooks
P	Simon Rosenblum-Larson	Mallards
P	Cole Bellair	Rivets
P	Cameron Busby	Rafters
P	Jack Eagan	Rafters
P	Quinn Dipasquale	Rafters
P	Jesse Slinger	Rafters
P	Orson Josephona	Woodchucks
P	Connor Manous	Growlers

=== Full-season All-Stars ===
After the season concluded, the league announced its Post-Season All-Stars for the full regular season. This group included players who performed well over the course of the entire season. Several players were selected to both the mid-season All-Star Game and the Post-Season All-Star team.

South Division

Hitters
Position	Player	Team
C	Hunter Feduccia	Rivets
1B	Ryan Stekl	Rafters
2B	Matthew Mika	Chinooks
3B	Jacob Richardson	Chinooks
SS	Bryson Stott	Rafters
INF	Alex Howard	Bombers
INF	Cole Daily	Mallards
OF	Dustin Woodcock	Rafters
OF	Stevie Mangrum	Woodchucks
OF	Doran Turchin	Mallards
DH	Connor Hollis	Growlers

Pitchers
Position	Player	Team
P	Simon Rosenblum-Larson	Mallards
P	Jesse Slinger	Rafters
P	Tyler Dyson	Mallards
P	Jack Eagan	Rafters
P	Connor Wollersheim	Bullfrogs
P	Isaiah Carranza	Rafters

Great Plains Division

Hitters
Position	Player	Team
C	Korey Lee	Loggers
1B	Zach Zubia	Honkers
2B	Chase Strumpf	Huskies
3B	David Villar	Loggers
SS	Andy Weber	Border Cats
OF	Marcus Still	Stingers
OF	Daniel Amaral	MoonDogs
OF	Kennie Taylor	Loggers
DH	Zach Gilles	Express

Pitchers
Position	Player	Team
P	Aaron Rozek	Rox
P	Brent Killam	Rox
P	Gus Varland	Stingers
P	Brett Newberg	MoonDogs
P	Polo Portela	Stingers
P	Andy Fisher	MoonDogs
P	Ryan Tapani	Huskies

== NWL alumni in MLB ==
=== MLB players who played in the NWL in 2017 ===
The following is a list of players who appeared in the NWL during the 2017 season, en route to a future appearance/career in MLB.

Name	2017 NWL team
Joey Gerber	Mankato MoonDogs
Nick Mears	Willmar Stingers
Owen Miller	Lakeshore Chinooks
Nick Fortes	Fond du Lac Dock Spiders
Bryson Stott	Wisconsin Rapids Rafters
Jared Solomon	St. Cloud Rox
Korey Lee	La Crosse Loggers
David Villar	La Crosse Loggers
Ryan Kreidler	Mankato MoonDogs
Louis Varland	Willmar Stingers
Gus Varland	Willmar Stingers
Jeff Lindgren	Bismarck Larks
Michael Busch	St. Cloud Rox
Brandon Williamson	Thunder Bay Border Cats
Alec Marsh	Lakeshore Chinooks
Kyle Leahy	Waterloo Bucks
Lane Ramsey	Eau Claire Express
Cam Eden	St. Cloud Rox
Nick Avila	Wisconsin Rapids Rafters
Chris Roycroft	Bismarck Larks
Daniel Schneemann	St. Cloud Rox
Hunter Feduccia	Rockford Rivets
Isaac Collins	Duluth Huskies
Maverick Handley	Madison Mallards
John Rave	Rockford Rivets
Drew Avans	St. Cloud Rox
Troy Johnston	Green Bay Bullfrogs

=== Alums with 2017 MLB debuts ===
The following is a list of NWL alums who made their Major League Baseball debuts in the 2017 MLB season.

Name	MLB debut	Debut team	Former NWL team(s)	Season(s) in NWL
Brock Stassi	4/3	Phillies	Woodchucks	2010
Jacob May	4/4	White Sox	Bullfrogs	2011
Andrew Knapp	4/6	Phillies	Loggers	2011
Phil Ervin	4/22	Reds	Bullfrogs	2011
John Brebbia	5/28	Cardinals	MoonDogs	2009
Paul DeJong	5/28	Cardinals	Woodchucks	2014
Jason Wheeler	5/30	Twins	River Bats	2010
Tyler Smith	6/2	Mariners	Loggers	2011
Brad Goldberg	6/3	White Sox	Express	2010-11
Seth Frankoff	6/9	Cubs	Border Cats	2008
Derek Fisher	6/14	Astros	Mallards	2012
Matt Chapman	6/15	Athletics	Loggers	2012
Cameron Perkins	6/20	Phillies	Bucks	2011
Zack Granite	7/8	Twins	Chinooks	2012
Andrew Stevenson	7/23	Nationals	Chinooks	2013
Harrison Bader	7/25	Cardinals	Chinooks	2013
Kyle McGrath	7/30	Padres	MoonDogs	2012
J.D. Davis	8/5	Astros	Woodchucks	2012
Dietrich Enns	8/10	Twins	Express	2010
Mitch Garver	8/19	Twins	River Bats	2010-11
Chad Wallach	8/27	Reds	Honkers	2012
Brian Anderson	9/1	Marlins	Chinooks	2012
Mike Marjama	9/3	Mariners	Loggers	2010

=== Awards and highlights ===
NWL alums selected the 2017 MLB All-Star Game:

- Pat Neshek (Wisconsin Woodchucks, 2000)
- Chris Sale (La Crosse Loggers, 2008)
- Max Scherzer (La Crosse Loggers, 2004)

NWL alums awarded with a 2017 Cy Young Award:

- Max Scherzer (La Crosse Loggers, 2004)

NWL alums awarded with a 2017 Gold Glove:

- Brandon Crawford (Mankato MoonDogs, 2005)

NWL alums who were members of the World Series-winning Houston Astros:

- Derek Fisher (Madison Mallards, 2012)

== See also ==
- 2017 Major League Baseball season
