= 2022 Northwoods League season =

29th annual season of the Northwoods League

- League: Northwoods League
- Sport: Baseball
- Duration: May 30 – August 13 (Playoffs: August 14 – August 18)
- Games: ~755
- Teams: 22

Northwoods League Championship
- Champions: Kalamazoo Growlers
- Runners-up: Duluth Huskies

Seasons
- ← 2021 2023 →

The 2022 Northwoods League season was the 29th season of baseball in the Northwoods League, a collegiate summer baseball organization. The season concluded in August with the Kalamazoo Growlers winning the championship.

== Season overview ==
=== Background ===
In 2022, there were 22 Northwoods League (NWL) baseball teams, split between the Great Lakes and Great Plains Divisions. These divisions were then split up between the Great Lakes East, Great Lakes West, Great Plains East, and Great Plains West subdivisions. The Traverse City Pit Spitters entered the season as defending champions, having defeated the St. Cloud Rox in the league's 2021 championship game.

While there were no new expansion teams for 2022, three teams changed their branding and identity. Under new ownership, the Green Bay Booyah changed their name to the Green Bay Rockers and unveiled new colors, uniforms, and logos. The Battle Creek Bombers changed their name to the Battle Creek Battle Jacks and introduced a new color scheme, logos, and dog mascot. Meanwhile, the Wisconsin Woodchucks reverted to the more specific place name that they had used in the 1990s, going forward as the Wausau Woodchucks. They also updated their logos and other aesthetics to reflect the change.

=== Season ===
The regular season began on May 30, with the season split into two halves, and the top two teams in each sub-division—the standings leader from each half—qualified for the playoffs. The first half sub-division winners were the Kalamazoo Growlers (Great Lakes East), Wisconsin Rapids Rafters (Great Lakes West), Duluth Huskies (Great Plains East), and St. Cloud Rox (Great Plains West). The second half sub-division winners were the Traverse City Pit Spitters (Great Lakes East), Wausau Woodchucks (Great Lakes West), Eau Claire Express (Great Plains East), and Willmar Stingers (Great Plains West).

In the four best-of-three subdivision series, the Growlers swept the Pit Spitters, the Rafters took 2 of 3 from the Woodchucks, the Huskies swept the Express, and the Stingers swept the Rox. In the single-game Great Lakes Division championship, the Growlers defeated the Rafters, and in the Great Plains, the Huskies defeated the Stingers.

The NWL Championship game was held at historic Wade Stadium in Duluth, Minnesota on 8/18/22. Kalamazoo led from the second inning on and defeated Duluth 8-3. The Growlers won their first NWL Championship.

=== Individual achievements ===
Outfielder Sean Ross of the Mankato MoonDogs was named 2022 NWL Player of the Year after batting .376 with eight home runs, 14 doubles, 3 triples, 51 runs scored, 53 RBI, and 21 stolen bases. Jack Habeck of the Willmar Stingers was named 2022 NWL Pitcher of the Year. Habeck appeared in 11 games (68.1 innings), going 8-0 with a 2.77 ERA.

In the 2022 Major League Baseball draft, 93 former NWL players were selected by MLB teams, including two players going in the top ten. Brooks Lee was the highest-selected of these alums, going 8th overall to the Minnesota Twins. Lee had played for Willmar in 2020. Gabriel Hughes was selected by the Colorado Rockies at pick #10. He has played for the 2020 Covid-19 temporary pod team, the Great Lakes Resorters.

== Standings ==
=== Great Lakes Division ===
Great Lakes East Sub-Division Regular Season Standings
Pos	Team	G	W	L	Pct.
1	y – Traverse City Pit Spitters	72	45	27	.625
2	Rockford Rivets	72	37	35	.514
3	x – Kalamazoo Growlers	71	36	35	.507
4	Battle Creek Battle Jacks	72	35	37	.486
5	Kenosha Kingfish	71	33	38	.465
6	Kokomo Jackrabbits	71	19	53	.268

Great Lakes West Sub-Division Regular Season Standings
Pos	Team	G	W	L	Pct.
1	x – Wisconsin Rapids Rafters	72	57	15	.792
2	y – Wausau Woodchucks	71	38	33	.535
3	Fond du Lac Dock Spiders	71	36	35	.507
4	Lakeshore Chinooks	72	36	36	.500
5	Green Bay Rockers	72	30	42	.417
6	Madison Mallards	72	26	46	.361

=== Great Plains Division ===
Great Plains East Sub-Division Regular Season Standings
Pos	Team	G	W	L	Pct.
1	y – Eau Claire Express	68	42	26	.618
2	x – Duluth Huskies	67	34	33	.507
3	La Crosse Loggers	68	31	37	.456
4	Waterloo Bucks	68	16	52	.235
5	Minnesota Mud Puppies	36	7	29	.194

Great Plains West Sub-Division Regular Season Standings
Pos	Team	G	W	L	Pct.
1	x – St. Cloud Rox	68	50	18	.735
2	y – Willmar Stingers	68	48	20	.706
3	Mankato MoonDogs	68	40	28	.588
4	Rochester Honkers	68	32	36	.471
5	Bismarck Larks	68	23	45	.338

- x – First Half Winner, clinched playoff spot
- y – Second Half Winner, clinched playoff spot

== Playoffs ==
=== Format ===
First and second half sub-divisional winners were eligible for the playoffs. The two playoff-eligible teams in each sub-division competed in a best-of-three Sub-Divisional Series. The two Sub-Divisional Series winners played a one-game Divisional Championship Game. The two Divisional Championship Game winners played a one-game League Championship.

=== Playoff bracket ===
Sub-Division Championship Series
1	Traverse City	4	5
2	Kalamazoo	5	9
↑ Great Lakes East / ↓ Great Lakes West
1	Wisconsin Rapids	6	1	9
2	Wausau	3	11	1
↑ Great Lakes / ↓ Great Plains
1	Eau Claire	6	3
2	Duluth	8	4
↑ Great Plains East / ↓ Great Plains West
1	St. Cloud	5	2
2	Willmar	6	3

Division Championship
1	Wisconsin Rapids	6
2	Kalamazoo	8
1	Willmar	3
2	Duluth	5

Northwoods League Championship
1	Duluth	3
2	Kalamazoo	8

== Statistical leaders ==
For cumulative stats, leaders include all league players. For rate stats, leaders include only qualifiers. Qualified hitters must have 2.70 plate appearances per team game. Per NWL standards, qualified pitchers must have minimum .80 innings pitched per team game. This significantly limits the pool of those qualifying for pitching rate stats.

=== Hitting ===
Stat	Player	Team	Total
H	Nick Mitchell	Dock Spiders	89
HR	Brendan Bobo	Rafters	17
RBI	Charlie Condon	Rox	68
AVG	Ben Ross	Rafters	.421
OPS	Ben Ross	Rafters	1.152
SB	Cadyn Schwabe	Express	36

=== Pitching ===
Stat	Player	Team	Total
ERA	Jack Habeck	Stingers	2.77
W	Jack Habeck, Josh Howitt, Hunter Day	Stingers, Rafters, Rox	8 (tie)
SO	Will Semb	Rockers	65
SV	Chase Grillo	Rox	13

== All-Star selections ==
=== Mid-season All-Star Game ===
The 2022 NWL mid-season All-Star game was played on 7/19/22 at Witter Field in Wisconsin Rapids, Wisconsin. The following players were selected to participate in the All-Star game.

Great Lakes Division

Hitters
Position	Player	Team
C	Matt DePrey	Chinooks
C	Josh Caron	Mallards
1B	Brendan Bobo	Rafters
2B	Sam Kirkpatrick	Growlers
3B	Garrett Broussard	Rafters
SS	Ben Ross	Rafters
IF	Brent Widder	Woodchucks
IF	Griffin O'Ferrall	Growlers
IF	Grant Hussey	Dock Spiders
UTL	Jacob Igawa	Rafters
OF	Nick Mitchell	Dock Spiders
OF	Ty Crittenberger	Rivets
OF	Matthew Mebane	Rivets
OF	Patrick Mills	Battle Jacks
OF	Garrett Martin	Chinooks

Pitchers
Position	Player	Team
P	Richard Kiel	Jackrabbits
P	Ty Rybarczyk	Rivets
P	Derek Clark	Pit Spitters
P	Mitch Mueller	Chinooks
P	Grant Manning	Rafters
P	Dylan Carter	Rockers
P	Clark Candiotti	Kingfish
P	Grayson Thurman	Kingfish
P	Bryce Woody	Mallards
P	Aren Gustafson	Pit Spitters
P	Kyle Seebach	Rivets
P	Eric Chalus	Chinooks
P	Steven Lacey	Mallards

Great Plains Division

Hitters
Position	Player	Team
C	Eduardo Rosario	Huskies
C	Drey Dirksen	Stingers
1B	Charlie Condon	Rox
2B	Boston Merila	MoonDogs
3B	Trevor Austin	Rox
SS	Kristian Campbell	Huskies
IF	Cameron Cromer	Bucks
UTL	Tai Walton	Bucks
UTL	Ben Vujovich	Mud Puppies
OF	Ryan Guardino	Bucks
OF	John Nett	Rox
OF	Sean Ross	MoonDogs
OF	Landon Wallace	Loggers
OF	Joey Walls	Stingers
OF	Nico Regino	Honkers

Pitchers
Position	Player	Team
P	Jack Habeck	Stingers
P	Hunter Day	Rox
P	Thaniel Trumper	Honkers
P	Jake Christianson	Huskies
P	Tyson Neighbors	MoonDogs
P	Edwin Colon	Larks
P	Matt Helwig	Express
P	Chase Grillo	Rox
P	Nathan Culley	Rox
P	Sam Malec	Stingers
P	John Klein	Stingers
P	Chase Chatman	Loggers

=== Full-season All-Stars ===
After the season concluded, the league announced its Post-Season All-Stars for the full regular season. This group included players who performed well over the course of the entire season. Several players were selected to both the mid-season All-Star Game and the Post-Season All-Star team.

Great Lakes Division

Hitters
Position	Player	Team
C	Matt DePrey	Chinooks
1B	Brendan Bobo	Rafters
2B	Tristin Garcia	Rockers
3B	Parker Noland	Dock Spiders
SS	Ben Ross	Rafters
OF	Nick Mitchell	Dock Spiders
OF	Patrick Mills	Battle Jacks
OF	Chase Hug	Woodchucks
DH	Kemp Alderman	Dock Spiders

Pitchers
Position	Player	Team
P	Josh Howitt	Rafters
P	Dylan Carter	Rockers
P	Ty Rybarcyzk	Rivets
P	Grayson Thurman	Kingfish
P	Mitch Mueller	Chinooks
P	Aren Gustafson	Pit Spitters

Great Plains Division

Hitters
Position	Player	Team
C	Drey Dirksen	Stingers
1B	Charlie Condon	Rox
2B	Aidan Sweatt	Loggers
3B	Aidan Byrne	Stingers
SS	Kristian Campbell	Huskies
OF	Joey Walls	Stingers
OF	Sean Ross	MoonDogs
OF	John Nett	Rox
DH	Ethan Mann	Rox

Pitchers
Position	Player	Team
P	Jack Habeck	Stingers
P	Hunter Day	Rox
P	Matt Helwig	Express
P	Chase Grillo	Rox
P	Tucker Novotny	Stingers
P	Carter Rost	Larks
P	Nolan Lebamoff	Huskies
P	Jacob Mrosko	Mud Puppies

== NWL alumni in MLB ==
=== MLB players who played in the NWL in 2022 ===
The following is a list of players who appeared in the NWL during the 2022 season, en route to a future career in MLB.

Name	2022 NWL team	MLB debut	MLB debut team
Hayden Birdsong	Lakeshore Chinooks	6/26/2024	San Francisco Giants
Kristian Campbell	Duluth Huskies	3/27/2025	Boston Red Sox
Brice Matthews	St. Cloud Rox	7/11/2025	Houston Astros
Jakob Marsee	Traverse City Pit Spitters	8/01/2025	Miami Marlins
JJ Wetherholt	Madison Mallards	3/26/2026	St. Louis Cardinals
George Klassen	Lakeshore Chinooks	4/5/2026	Los Angeles Angels
John Klein	Willmar Stingers	5/2/2026	Minnesota Twins
Charles McAdoo	Mankato MoonDogs	5/29/2026	Toronto Blue Jays
Brett Bateman	Willmar Stingers	8/7/2026	Toronto Blue Jays
Ben Ross	Wisconsin Rapids Rafters	9/1/2026	Minnesota Twins

=== Alums with 2022 MLB debuts ===
The following is a list of NWL alums who made their Major League Baseball debuts in the 2022 MLB season.

Name	MLB debut	Debut team	Former NWL team(s)	Season(s) in NWL
Bryson Stott	4/8	Phillies	Rafters	2017
Zach Jackson	4/9	Athletics	Rafters	2014
Steven Wilson	4/9	Padres	Express	2014
Tanner Banks	4/10	White Sox	Stingers	2011-12
Bryan Lavastida	4/10	Guardians	Woodchucks	2018
Phoenix Sanders	4/14	Rays	Stingers	2014
Mark Kolozsvary	4/20	Reds	Chinooks	2015
Mickey McDonald	4/20	Athletics	Express	2016
Tanner Tully	4/22	Guardians	Bombers	2014
Richie Palacios	4/25	Guardians	Rafters	2016
Jason Krizan	4/29	Giants	Bucks	2009
Penn Murfee	4/29	Mariners	Border Cats	2015
Jared Solomon	5/7	Reds	Rox	2017
Danny Young	5/9	Mariners	Woodchucks	2013
Mark Contreras	5/11	Twins	Honkers	2015-16
Brandon Hughes	5/17	Cubs	Growlers	2015
Michael Papierski	5/21	Giants	Express, Border Cats	2015, 2016
Cody Sedlock	5/29	Orioles	Bucks	2014
Steele Walker	6/5	Rangers	Woodchucks	2016
Jonah Bride	6/14	Athletics	Rafters, Bucks	2015
Cam Vieaux	6/17	Pirates	Chinooks	2014
Matthew Batten	6/30	Padres	Border Cats	2015
Korey Lee	7/1	Astros	Loggers	2017-18
David Villar	7/4	Giants	Loggers	2017
Alex Call	7/11	Guardians	Express	2013-14
Erich Uelmen	7/22	Cubs	Express	2015
Terrin Vavra	7/29	Orioles	Huskies	2015
Charles Leblanc	7/30	Marlins	Growlers	2015
Cal Stevenson	8/10	Athletics	Huskies	2015
Greg Weissert	8/25	Yankees	Border Cats	2015
David Hensley	8/27	Astros	Growlers	2016
Garrett Mitchell	8/27	Brewers	MoonDogs	2018
Ben DeLuzio	9/2	Cardinals	Rox	2016
Ryan Kreidler	9/2	Tigers	MoonDogs	2017
Louis Varland	9/7	Twins	Stingers	2017-18
Cole Waites	9/13	Giants	Rafters	2018
Frank German	9/17	Red Sox	Mallards	2016
Miles Mastrobuoni	9/22	Rays	Honkers	2015
Nate Mondou	10/4	Athletics	Woodchucks	2014

=== Awards and highlights ===
NWL alums selected the 2022 MLB All-Star Game:

- Pete Alonso (Madison Mallards, 2014)
- Tony Gonsolin (Madison Mallards, 2015)
- Jose Trevino (Madison Mallards, 2012)

NWL alums awarded with a 2022 Gold Glove:

- Jose Trevino (Madison Mallards, 2012)

NWL alums who were members of the World Series-winning Houston Astros:

- David Hensley (Kalamazoo Growlers, 2016)

== See also ==
- 2022 Major League Baseball season
