= Eau Claire Express =

Wisconsin collegiate summer baseball team

- Cap insignia

Information
- League: Northwoods League (Great Plains East 2019–present) (North Division 2014–2018) (South Division 2005–2013)
- Location: Eau Claire, Wisconsin
- Ballpark: Carson Park
- Founded: 2005
- Division championships: 4 (2007, 2010, 2016, 2019)
- League championships: 1 (2010)
- Colors: Tennessee orange, navy, AFA blue
- Ownership: Craig Toycen, The Toycen Baseball Club, LLC
- Management: Jake Horan
- Manager: Dale Varsho
- Media: Eau Claire Leader Telegram
- Website: EauClaireExpress.com

The Eau Claire Express is a collegiate summer baseball team playing in the Northwoods League. Their home games are played at historic Carson Park in Eau Claire, Wisconsin.

As of 2026, 21 former Express players have gone on to appear in Major League Baseball, including Jordan Zimmermann, Kole Calhoun, Alex Call, Griffin Jax and Daulton Varsho.

== History ==
In 2005, the Express were added as an expansion team to the Northwoods League (NWL), entering alongside the Brainerd Blue Thunder.

In 2007, the Express qualified for the NWL playoffs for the first time. In the South Division Championship Series, they defeated the Green Bay Bullfrogs, taking two games in a best-of-three series. In the 2007 Northwoods League Championship Series, they faced the North Division Champion St. Cloud River Bats and were swept 2–0. In 2009, the Express won the NWL South Division to qualify for the playoffs. They were eliminated in two games by the La Crosse Loggers in the Northwoods League Divisional round.

In 2010, the Express qualified for the playoffs and defeated the Rochester Honkers to secure their first NWL Championship victory.

The 2016 season saw the Express return to the Northwoods League postseason after winning the season's first half title. This was the first time the team had qualified for the playoffs since the 2010 season. Eau Claire opened the playoffs hosting the Mankato MoonDogs in the first round of the Divisional Playoffs at Carson Park. Despite having only a 1–7 record vs. Mankato in the regular season, Eau Claire was able to defeat the MoonDogs to advance. The next night the team traveled to St. Cloud, Minn. to face the second half champion Rox for a chance to play for the NWL Championship. After blowing a late lead, the Express were able to defeat the Rox in extra innings to win the North Division title. Awaiting the Express in the NWL Championship Series was the Wisconsin Rapids Rafters, the owners of the league's best regular season record. Eau Claire led game one by a run with two outs in the ninth inning before giving up a walk-off, two-run home run to lose. The Express would go on to lose game two the following night at Carson Park to end a successful season and concede the Northwoods League title to the Rafters.

In 2022, The Eau Claire Express won the Great Plains East Division (2nd Half) with a record of 42–26. The Express lost in the first round of the playoffs to the eventual Plains Division champion Duluth Huskies.

In 2023, the Express found themselves back in the playoffs, winning the first half despite an 0–3 start which they were outscored 11–20 and gave up 8 runs in two of those games. They went 20–11 the rest of the first half and clinched it with a 12–1 win on July 3 over the Rochester Honkers. In the first round of the playoffs, they were swept by La Crosse in 2 games.

In the 2025 season, the Express debuted the WNB Financial video board in right center field of Carson Park. The state-of-the-art video was designed by Daktronics.

== Season-by-season-records ==
Season	GP	W	L	Playoffs
2005	68	28	40	Did not qualify
2006	67	29	38	Did not qualify
2007	68	42	26	Won South Div. Finals 6–3, vs. Green Bay Bullfrogs; Lost Championship 0–2, vs. St. Cloud River Bats
2008	68	33	35	Did not qualify
2009	68	36	32	Lost South Div. Finals 0–2, vs. La Crosse Loggers
2010	70	48	22	Won South Div. Finals 2–1 vs. Wisconsin Woodchucks; Won Championship 2–1, vs. Rochester Honkers; NORTHWOODS LEAGUE CHAMPIONS
2011	70	36	34	Did not qualify
2012	70	26	44	Did not qualify
2013	70	33	37	Did not qualify
2014	72	36	36	Did not qualify
2015	71	29	42	Did not qualify
2016	72	45	27	Won North Div. Semi-Finals 1–0, vs. Mankato Moondogs; Won North Div. Finals 1–0, vs. St. Cloud Rox; Lost League Championship 0–2, vs. Wisconsin Rapids Rafters
2017	72	39	33	Lost North Div. Semi-Finals 0–1, vs. Mankato Moondogs
2018	71	28	43	Did not qualify
2019	72	40	32	Won Great Plains East Finals, 2-games-to-0 vs. Waterloo Bucks; Won Great Plains Finals, 2–0 vs. Willmar Stingers; Lost League Championship, 2–3 vs. Traverse City Pit Spitters
2020	0	0	0	Did not play due to the COVID-19 pandemic
2021	68	27	41	Did not qualify
2022	68	42	26	Lost Great Plains East Finals, 0–2 vs. Duluth Huskies
2023	67	36	31	Lost Great Plains East Finals, 0–2 vs. La Crosse Loggers
2024	70	35	35	Did not qualify
2025	72	32	40	Did not qualify
2026	69	46	23	Won Great Plains East Championship 2-1, vs. La Crosse Loggers; Lost Great Plains Championship 5-10 vs. St. Cloud Rox

== Roster ==
The Roster for the 2027 season has not been announced.

== Express Players to reach MLB ==
As of the end of the 2025 season, a total of 21 former Express players have appeared in Major League Baseball.

Name	Year(s) with Express	MLB accolades
Nevin Ashley	2006	
Caleb Boushley	2016	
Kole Calhoun	2007–09	Gold Glove Award
Alex Call	2013–14	World Series Champion
Dietrich Enns	2010	
Eddie Gamboa	2007	
Brad Goldberg	2010–11	
Sam Haggerty	2013	
Louis Head	2009	
Griffin Jax	2015	
A.J. Ladwig	2012	
Irving Lopez	2015	
Mickey McDonald	2016	
Nathan Orf	2010	
Michael Papierski	2015	
Lane Ramsey	2017	
Justin Slaten	2018	
Erich Uelmen	2015	
Daulton Varsho	2015–16	Gold Glove Award
Steven Wilson	2014	
Jordan Zimmermann	2006	All-Star (2x), No-hitter

Additionally, former Express players Justin Viele, Mark Hallberg, Harvey Martin, and Trent Blank went on to have MLB coaching positions.
