= 2016 Northwoods League season =

23rd annual season of the Northwoods League

- League: Northwoods League
- Sport: Baseball
- Teams: 18

Northwoods League Championship
- Champions: Wisconsin Rapids Rafters
- Runners-up: Eau Claire Express

Seasons
- ← 2015 2017 →

The 2016 Northwoods League season was the 23rd season of baseball in the Northwoods League, a collegiate summer baseball organization. The season concluded in August with the Wisconsin Rapids Rafters winning the championship.

== Season overview ==
=== Background ===
In 2016, the NWL had eighteen teams, split evenly between a North and South Division. The Kenosha Kingfish entered the season as defending champions, having defeated the St. Cloud Rox in the 2015 NWL championship series.

Following the 2015 season, the Alexandria Blue Anchors ceased operations due to financial problems. The league was able to stay at 18 teams due to the Rockford Rivets being added. The Rivets were the NWL's first foray into Illinois. Rockford was added to the South Division, and the La Crosse Loggers were shifted to the North, filling the spot left by Alexandria leaving.

=== Season ===
The regular season began in May, with the season split into two halves. The teams with the best records in the division for each half automatically qualified for a playoff berth, with two additional teams from each division added to the playoffs based on overall season record. This resulted in eight teams qualifying for the playoffs.

The playoff qualifiers for each division were as follows:

- North Division - St. Cloud Rox, Eau Claire Express, Mankato MoonDogs, Willmar Stingers
- South Division - Battle Creek Bombers, Lakeshore Chinooks, Madison Mallards, Wisconsin Rapids Rafters

In the four single-elimination first round playoff games, the Express beat the MoonDogs, the Rox beat the Stingers, the Bombers beat the Mallards, and the Rafters beat the Chinooks. In the single-game divisional championship round, the Express defeated the Rox and the Rafters defeated the Bombers.

The championship series was a best-of-three set between the Rafters and the Express. The Rafters swept the Express and claimed their first NWL title.

=== Individual achievements ===
Jake Shepski of the Mankato MoonDogs was named 2016 NWL Most Valuable Player after batting .339 with 11 home runs and 54 RBI. Marshall Kasowski of the Lakeshore Chinooks was named 2016 NWL Pitcher of the Year. He appeared in 12 games (63.1 innings), maintaining 1.56 ERA, and led the league with 87 strikeouts.

Daulton Varsho had an exceptional season as catcher for the Eau Claire Express. 2017 was his second season in the NWL, at age 19, after his sophomore year at UW-Milwaukee. Varsho, who grew up in Marshfield, Wisconsin, was coached by his uncle Dale Varsho, the field manager of the Express. In 293 plate appearances across 63 games, Varsho batted .321 (1.014 OPS) with 15 home runs, 63 RBI, 45 walks, and 26 stolen bases. Other future MLB players who had excellent 2016 NWL seasons include Nico Hoerner, Griffin Conine, TJ Friedl, Steele Walker, Mason McCoy, and Lars Nootbaar.

In the 2016 Major League Baseball draft, 176 former NWL players were selected by MLB teams. A.J. Puk was the highest-selected alum, going to the Oakland Athletics with the 6th pick. Puk had played for the Waterloo Bucks in 2014. Puk was one of five alums taken in the first round, with the others being Matt Thaiss (Angels), Will Craig (Pirates), Cody Sedlock (Orioles), and Dane Dunning (Nationals). Former Madison Mallard Pete Alonso was drafted by the New York Mets in the second round.

== Standings and playoffs ==
North Division
Pos	Team	W	L	Pct.
1	x – St. Cloud Rox	48	23	.676
2	x – Mankato MoonDogs	46	26	.639
3	x – Eau Claire Express	45	27	.625
4	x – Willmar Stingers	41	31	.569
5	La Crosse Loggers	38	33	.535
6	Waterloo Bucks	36	36	.500
7	Duluth Huskies	30	42	.417
8	Thunder Bay Border Cats	21	51	.292
9	Rochester Honkers	20	52	.278

South Division
Pos	Team	W	L	Pct.
1	x – Wisconsin Rapids Rafters	49	23	.681
2	x – Madison Mallards	43	29	.597
3	x – Battle Creek Bombers	39	33	.542
4	x – Lakeshore Chinooks	35	37	.486
5	Kalamazoo Growlers	33	39	.458
6	Rockford Rivets	33	39	.458
7	Green Bay Bullfrogs	32	40	.444
8	Wisconsin Woodchucks	31	40	.437
9	Kenosha Kingfish	26	46	.361

- x – Qualified for playoffs based on either best record (first or second half of season) or as a wildcard due to overall record.

=== Playoff bracket ===
Wildcard round
Eau Claire
Mankato
St. Cloud
Willmar
↑ North Division ↓ South Division
Battle Creek
Madison
Wisconsin Rapids
Lakeshore

Division Championship
Eau Claire
St. Cloud
Wisconsin Rapids
Battle Creek

League Championship series
Wisconsin Rapids
Eau Claire

== Statistical leaders ==
Qualified hitters must have minimum of 71 at-bats per season.

=== Hitting ===
Stat	Player	Team	Total
H	Danny Paredo	Stingers	95
HR	Griffin Conine	Loggers	16
RBI	Greg Lambert	Stingers	66
AVG	Steele Walker	Woodchucks	.406
OPS	Joe Wainhouse	Rafters	1.042
SB	Connor Kopach	Chinooks	50

=== Pitching ===
Stat	Player	Team	Total
W	Caleb Boushley, Scott Parker	Express, Woodchucks	8 (tie)
SO	Marshall Kasowski	Chinooks	87
SV	Collin Strall, Gordon Cardenas	Rox, Woodchucks	10 (tie)

== All-Star selections ==
=== Mid-season All-Star Game ===
The 2016 NWL mid-season All-Star Game was played on 7/19/16 at historic Simmons Field in Kenosha, Wisconsin. The following players were selected to participate in the All-Star game.

North Division

Hitters
Position	Player	Team
C	Daulton Varsho	Express
C	Adam McGinnis	Bucks
C	Luke Ringhofer	Rox
1B	Greg Lambert	Stingers
1B	Jordan Kozicky	MoonDogs
2B	Drew Freedman	Rox
3B	Carter Hanford	Huskies
SS	Mason McCoy	Loggers
SS	Andrew Fregia	Border Cats
OF	Jake Shepski	MoonDogs
OF	Danny Pardo	Stingers
OF	Ricky Ramirez	Rox
OF	Ben Mezzenga	Express
OF	TJ Friedl	Rox
OF	Turner Buis	Honkers
OF	Daniel Amaral	Huskies

Pitchers
Position	Player	Team
P	Wade Regas	Huskies
P	Austin Dubsky	Rox
P	Caleb Boushley	Express
P	Ryan Tapani	Huskies
P	Dalton Roach	Express
P	Austin Schulfer	Express
P	Collin Strall	Rox
P	Brandon Downey	Bucks
P	Derek Hendrixson	Bucks
P	Jared Crescentini	Bucks
P	Mitch Stalsberg	Loggers
P	Ricky Digrugilliers	MoonDogs
P	Logan Salow	Rox
P	Blake Stockert	Stingers

South Division

Hitters
Position	Player	Team
C	Nick Hutchins	Growlers
C	Tim DalPorto	Chinooks
1B	Steve Passatempo	Woodchucks
2B	Jake Lumley	Rafters
2B	David Cronin	Rivets
3B	Marty Bechina	Kingfish
SS	Conner Kopach	Growlers
OF	Daniel Jipping	Bombers
OF	Daniel Robinson	Growlers
OF	Marcus Shoemaker	Bullfrogs
OF	Zach Jarrett	Mallards
OF	Laren Eustace	Bullfrogs
OF	Logan Mattix	Rafters

Pitchers
Position	Player	Team
P	B.J. Butler	Growlers
P	Devin Pellien	Growlers
P	Chris Cooper	Rafters
P	Marshall Kasowski	Chinooks
P	Troy Bacon	Mallards
P	Anthony Dahl	Rivets
P	Garrett Schilling	Rafters
P	Austin Hancock	Bullfrogs
P	Jeremy Graf	Bullfrogs
P	Brendon Allen	Kingfish
P	Keenan Bartlett	Chinooks
P	Ryan Orr	Kingfish
P	Kacey Murphy	Rivets
P	Scott Parker	Woodchucks
P	Cameron Busby	Rafters
P	Luke Lind	Bullfrogs

=== Full-season All-Stars ===
After the season concluded, the league announced its Post-Season All-Stars for the full regular season. This group included players who performed well over the course of the entire season. Several players were selected to both the mid-season All-Star Game and the Post-Season All-Star team.

South Division

Hitters
Position	Player	Team
C	Nick Hutchins	Growlers
1B	Steve Passatempo	Woodchucks
2B	Jake Lumley	Rafters
3B	Marty Bechina	Kingfish
SS	Conner Kopach	Growlers
OF	Daniel Jipping	Bombers
OF	Steele Walker	Woodchucks
OF	Marcus Shoemaker	Bullfrogs
DH	Nico Hoerner	Mallards

Pitchers
Position	Player	Team
P	B.J. Butler	Growlers
P	Devin Pellien	Growlers
P	Chris Cooper	Rafters
P	Marshall Kasowski	Chinooks
P	Troy Bacon	Mallards
P	Garrett Schilling	Rafters
P	Luke Lind	Bullfrogs

Great Plains Division

Hitters
Position	Player	Team
C	Daulton Varsho	Express
1B	Greg Lambert	Stingers
2B	Cullen Large	Loggers
3B	David Metzgar	MoonDogs
SS	Mason McCoy	Loggers
OF	Jake Shepski	MoonDogs
OF	Danny Pardo	Stingers
OF	Ricky Ramirez	Rox
DH	Griffin Conine	Loggers

Pitchers
Position	Player	Team
P	Caleb Boushley	Express
P	Collin Strall	Rox
P	Derek Hendrixson	Bucks
P	Ricky Digrugilliers	MoonDogs
P	Brian Glowicki	Rox
P	Nick Raquet	Loggers

== NWL alumni in MLB ==
=== MLB players who played in the NWL in 2016 ===
The following is a list of players who appeared in the NWL during the 2016 season, en route to a future appearance/career in MLB.

Name	2016 NWL team
Nico Hoerner	Madison Mallards
Alex Vesia	Mankato MoonDogs
Daulton Varsho	Eau Claire Express
Jared Oliva	Wisconsin Woodchucks
Ty Tice	Willmar Stingers
Hunter Owen	Green Bay Bullfrogs
Owen Miller	Lakeshore Chinooks
Matt Vierling	Madison Mallards
Lars Nootbaar	La Crosse Loggers
Drew Ellis	Rochester Honkers
Ryan Dorow	Battle Creek Bombers
TJ Friedl	St. Cloud Rox
Mickey McDonald	Eau Claire Express
Richie Palacios	Wisconsin Rapids Rafters
Mark Contreras	Rochester Honkers
Michael Papierski	Thunder Bay Border Cats
Steele Walker	Wisconsin Woodchucks
David Hensley	Kalamazoo Growlers
Ben DeLuzio	St. Cloud Rox
Frank German	Madison Mallards
César Salazar	La Crosse Loggers
Kyle Leahy	Waterloo Bucks
Mason McCoy	La Crosse Loggers
Caleb Boushley	Eau Claire Express
Griffin Conine	La Crosse Loggers
Hayden Senger	Lakeshore Chinooks
Grant Wolfram	Kalamazoo Growlers
Nick Raquet	La Crosse Loggers
Tanner Andrews	Kalamazoo Growlers
Jack Ralston	La Crosse Loggers

=== Alums with 2016 MLB debuts ===
The following is a list of NWL alums who made their Major League Baseball debuts in the 2016 MLB season.

Name	MLB debut	Debut team	Former NWL team(s)	Season(s) in NWL
Tyler Naquin	4/5	Indians	MoonDogs	2010
Andy Burns	5/9	Blue Jays	Huskies	2008-09
Matt Reynolds	5/17	Mets	River Bats	2010
Tony Kemp	5/17	Astros	Honkers	2011
Alec Mills	5/18	Royals	Mallards	2012
Richard Bleier	5/30	Yankees	Beetles	2007
Jacob Barnes	6/3	Brewers	Stingers	2010
Brock Stewart	6/29	Dodger	Mallards	2013
Steven Brault	7/5	Pirates	Lunkers, Stingers	2011, 2012-13
Buddy Baumann	7/16	Padres	River Bats	2007
Matt Strahm	7/31	Royals	Honkers	2011
Tony Renda	8/2	Reds	River Bats	2009
Mitch Haniger	8/16	Diamondbacks	Bullfrogs	2011
Ben Heller	8/26	Yankees	Rafters	2012
Jake Esch	8/31	Marlins	Mallards	2009-10
Eddie Gamboa	9/2	Rays	Express	2007
Jake Smith	9/7	Padres	River Bats	2011
Blake Smith	9/10	White Sox	Beetles	2007
Hunter Dozier	9/12	Royals	Stingers	2012

=== Awards and highlights ===
NWL alums selected the 2016 MLB All-Star Game:

- Mark Melancon (Duluth Huskies, 2004)
- Chris Sale (La Crosse Loggers, 2008)
- Max Scherzer (La Crosse Loggers, 2004)
- Ben Zobrist (Wisconsin Woodchucks, 2003)

NWL alums awarded with a 2016 Cy Young Award:

- Max Scherzer (La Crosse Loggers, 2004)

NWL alums awarded with a 2016 Gold Glove:

- Brandon Crawford (Mankato MoonDogs, 2005)

NWL alums who were members of the World Series-winning Chicago Cubs:

- Ben Zobrist (Wisconsin Woodchucks, 2003)

== See also ==
- 2016 Major League Baseball season
