= Mankato MoonDogs =

- Founded in 1999; Mankato, Minnesota
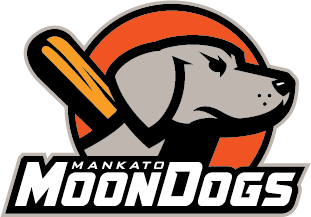
Team logo
Cap insignia

Minor league affiliations
- Class: Collegiate summer baseball
- League: Northwoods League (1999–present)
- Division: Great Plains West (2019-present); North Division (1999-2018)

Minor league titles
- League titles: none
- Division titles: 2011; 2012; 2014

Team data
- Previous names: Mankato Mashers (1999–2001)
- Colors: Black, orange, white, gray, light orange
- Mascot: Muttnik
- Ballpark: ISG Field (1999–present)
- Owner(s)/ Operator(s): Chad Surprenant and Kyle Smith
- President: Chris Goodell
- General manager: Walker Regier
- Manager: Danny Kneeland
- Website: northwoodsleague.com/mankato-moondogs/

The Mankato MoonDogs are an American amateur baseball team that plays in the Northwoods League, a collegiate summer baseball league. Their home games are played at ISG Field in Mankato, Minnesota. Several former Mankato players have gone on to play in Major League Baseball, including Curtis Granderson, Brandon Crawford, Alex Vesia, Garrett Mitchell, and Jacob Wilson.

== History ==
The team started play in 1999 as the Mankato Mashers, effectively serving as a replacement for the Kenosha Kroakers club which had folded after the 1998 season. In their inaugural season, the Mashers were the only team in the Northwoods League to broadcast their games on television.

The Mashers were renamed in 2002 to the MoonDogs when the franchise was acquired by Joe Schwei. The Moondogs were again sold in January 2013 to Mark Ogren. The current ownership group of Chad Superenant and Kyle Smith took over the club in 2018.

From 2008 to 2018 the MoonDogs made the playoffs eight of eleven seasons, making it to the NWL Championship on three occasions. In 2014 the MoonDogs were defeated by the Lakeshore Chinooks in a two-game series sweep.

== Season-by-season ==
Season	W	L	Divisional result	Playoffs
1999	28	34		
2000	27	37		
2001	36	28		
2002	33	31		
2003	27	37		
2004	21	43		
2005	34	34		
2006	32	35		
2007	35	32		
2008	41	27		
2009	39	29	2nd of 7	Lost division finals vs Rochester Honkers
2010	29	41	8th of 8	DNQ
2011	42	28	2nd of 8	Won division finals vs Alexandria Beetles Lost finals vs Battle Creek Bombers
2012	42	27	1st of 8	Won division finals vs Willmar Stingers Lost finals vs La Crosse Loggers
2013	38	32	4th of 8	DNQ
2014	42	30	3rd of 10	Won division finals vs Willmar Stingers Lost finals vs Lakeshore Chinooks
2015	33	39	6th of 9	DNQ
2016	46	26	2nd of 9	Lost division semifinals vs Willmar Stingers
2017	44	28	1st of 10	Won division semifinals vs Eau Claire Express Lost division finals vs St. Cloud Rox
2018	46	26	3rd of 10	Lost division semifinals vs Willmar Stingers
2019	36	36	4th of 5	DNQ
2020	17	25	4th of 5	DNQ
2021	44	24	2nd of 5	Lost sub-division series vs St. Cloud Rox
2022	40	28	3rd of 5	DNQ
2023	38	30	3rd of 6	DNQ
2024	38	32	3rd of 6	DNQ
2025	38	33	3rd of 6	Won sub-division series vs St. Cloud Rox Lost division finals vs Duluth Huskies
2026	37	33	2nd of 6	DNQ

== Notable alumni (played in MLB) ==
Name	Mankato year(s)	MLB debut team	MLB accolades
Jack Hannahan	1999	Detroit Tigers	
Paul McAnulty	2001	San Diego Padres	
Curtis Granderson	2001	Detroit Tigers	All-Star (3x), Silver Slugger, Roberto Clemente Award
Tommy Everidge	2002	Oakland Athletics	
Neil Wagner	2004/2005	Oakland Athletics	
Cole De Vries	2004	Minnesota Twins	
Brandon Crawford	2005	San Francisco Giants	All-Star (3x), Silver Slugger, Gold Glove (4x), WS Champion (2x)
Tyson Brummett	2005/2006	Philadelphia Phillies	
Cody Decker	2007	San Diego Padres	
Sean Halton	2006	Milwaukee Brewers	
Erik Hamren	2008	San Diego Padres	
John Brebbia	2009	St. Louis Cardinals	
Jake Petricka	2009	Chicago White Sox	
Tyler Naquin	2010	Cleveland Indians	AL Rookie of the Month (2x)
Sam Selman	2010/2011	San Francisco Giants	
Nick Goody	2011	New York Yankees	
Kyle McGrath	2012	San Diego Padres	
Sam Clay	2013	Washington Nationals	
Alex Vesia	2016	Miami Marlins	World Series Champion (2x)
Joey Gerber	2017	Seattle Mariners	
Ryan Kreidler	2017	Detroit Tigers	
Garrett Mitchell	2018	Milwaukee Brewers	World Series Champion
Brandon Pfaadt	2018	Arizona Diamondbacks	
Hayden Juenger	2019	Toronto Blue Jays	
Andre Granillo	2020	St. Louis Cardinals	
Jacob Wilson	2021	Oakland Athletics	All-Star, AL Rookie of the Month
Charles McAdoo	2022	Toronto Blue Jays	

== Staff ==
The team's General Manager, Walker Regier, is from Southern Minnesota, he previously interned for the Willmar Stingers, another Northwoods League team.

== Muttnik ==
Listed at 6'3" and 210 lbs, the MoonDogs mascot throws and bats right pawed. Muttnik can be seen mingling with the crowd during games or at various community events throughout the year.
