= 2021 Northwoods League season =

28th annual season of the Northwoods League

- League: Northwoods League
- Sport: Baseball
- Duration: May 31 – August 14 (Playoffs: August 15 – August 20)
- Games: ~753
- Teams: 22

Northwoods League Championship
- Champions: Traverse City Pit Spitters
- Runners-up: St. Cloud Rox

Seasons
- ← 2020 2022 →

The 2021 Northwoods League season was the 28th season of baseball in the Northwoods League, a collegiate summer baseball organization. The season concluded in August with the Traverse City Pit Spitters winning the championship.

== Season overview ==
=== Background ===
In 2021, there were 22 Northwoods League (NWL) baseball teams, split between the Great Lakes and Great Plains Divisions. These divisions were then split up between the Great Lakes East, Great Lakes West, Great Plains East, and Great Plains West subdivisions.

2021 marked a return to a full season of baseball after the Covid-19-altered 2020 season. In 2020, the league still operated, but teams competed in temporary regional pod divisions. Furthermore, several temporary team identities were created by existing teams, sharing a stadium and playing scrimmage-like games against each other. Heading into 2021, all six of these temporary teams (the K-Town Bobbers, Northern Michigan Dune Bears, Great Lakes Resorters, Kalamazoo Mac Daddies, Mandan Flickertails, and Bismarck Bull Moose) were dissolved.

Since the pandemic was still in full swing, the Thunder Bay Border Cats were unable to participate due to Canada–United States border restrictions. To make up for the schedule absence of the Border Cats, the league created the Minnesota Mud Puppies as a travel-only team, based in the greater Twin Cities area, but not having a home stadium.

=== Season ===
The regular season began on May 31, with the season split into two halves, and the top two teams in each sub-division—the standings leader from each half—qualified for the playoffs. The first half sub-division winners were the Traverse City Pit Spitters (Great Lakes East), Fond du Lac Dock Spiders (Great Lakes West), Waterloo Bucks (Great Plains East), and St. Cloud Rox (Great Plains West). The second half sub-division winners were the Kokomo Jackrabbits (Great Lakes East), Madison Mallards (Great Lakes West), Duluth Huskies (Great Plains East), and Mankato MoonDogs (Great Plains West).

In the four best-of-three subdivision series, the Pit Spitters took 2 of 3 from the Jackrabbits, the Mallards swept the Dock Spiders, the Bucks swept the Huskies, and the Rox swept the MoonDogs. In the single-game Great Lakes Division championship, the Pit Spitters defeated the Mallards. In the Great Plains, the Rox defeated the Bucks.

The NWL Championship game was held at Joe Faber Field in St. Cloud, Minnesota on 8/20/21. The Rox scored first, putting up a run in the second inning. But the Pit Spitters put up two unanswered runs in the 4th, 5th, and 6th. Traverse City ultimately defeated St. Cloud 9-3 and won their second NWL championship.

=== Individual achievements ===
Chandler Simpson of the Fond du Lac Dock Spiders and Matt Higgins of the Mankato MoonDogs were named 2021 NWL Co-Most Valuable Players. Simpson hit .377 with 23 RBI, 52 runs scored, and 55 stolen bases. His stolen bases tally set a new NWL single-season record at the time. Higgins hit for a .335 average with 5 home runs, 19 doubles and 50 RBI.

Cam Schuelke of the Traverse City Pit Spitters was named 2021 NWL Pitcher of the Year. He appeared in 15 games (53 innings) and had eight wins, 48 strikeouts and a 0.68 ERA

In the 2021 Major League Baseball draft, an even 100 former NWL players were selected by MLB teams. Jordan Wicks was the highest-selected alum, going to the Chicago Cubs with the 21st pick.

== Standings ==
=== Great Lakes Division ===
Great Lakes East Sub-Division Regular Season Standings
Pos	Team	G	W	L	Pct.
1	y – Kokomo Jackrabbits	72	45	27	.625
2	x – Traverse City Pit Spitters	71	42	29	.592
3	Kenosha Kingfish	72	39	33	.542
4	Rockford Rivets	70	29	41	.414
5	Battle Creek Bombers	72	27	45	.375
6	Kalamazoo Growlers	72	26	46	.361

Great Lakes West Sub-Division Regular Season Standings
Pos	Team	G	W	L	Pct.
1	Wisconsin Woodchucks	72	44	28	.611
2	x – Fond du Lac Dock Spiders	71	43	28	.606
3	y – Madison Mallards	71	39	32	.549
4	Wisconsin Rapids Rafters	72	38	34	.528
5	Lakeshore Chinooks	70	31	39	.443
6	Green Bay Booyah	72	25	47	.347

=== Great Plains Division ===
Great Plains East Sub-Division Regular Season Standings
Pos	Team	G	W	L	Pct.
1	x – Waterloo Bucks	67	42	25	.627
2	y – Duluth Huskies	68	30	38	.441
3	La Crosse Loggers	68	28	40	.412
4	Eau Claire Express	68	27	41	.397
5	Minnesota Mud Puppies	36	10	26	.278

Great Plains West Sub-Division Regular Season Standings
Pos	Team	G	W	L	Pct.
1	x – St. Cloud Rox	68	50	18	.735
2	y – Mankato MoonDogs	68	44	24	.647
3	Willmar Stingers	68	32	36	.471
4	Rochester Honkers	67	30	37	.448
5	Bismarck Larks	68	30	38	.441

- x – First Half Winner, clinched playoff spot
- y – Second Half Winner, clinched playoff spot

== Playoffs ==
=== Format ===
First and second half sub-divisional winners were eligible for the playoffs. The two playoff-eligible teams in each sub-division competed in a best-of-three Sub-Divisional Series. The two Sub-Divisional Series winners played a one-game Divisional Championship Game. The two Divisional Championship Game winners played a one-game League Championship.

=== Playoff bracket ===
Sub-Division Championship Series
1	Kokomo	2	3	6
2	Traverse City	9	0	9
↑ Great Lakes East / ↓ Great Lakes West
1	Fond du Lac	0	1
2	Madison	5	4
↑ Great Lakes / ↓ Great Plains
1	Waterloo	8	6
2	Duluth	6	0
↑ Great Plains East / ↓ Great Plains West
1	St. Cloud	10	9
2	Mankato	0	2

Division Championship
1	Traverse City	6
2	Madison	2
1	St. Cloud	6
2	Waterloo	3

Northwoods League Championship
1	St. Cloud	3
2	Traverse City	9

== Statistical leaders ==
For cumulative stats, leaders include all league players. For rate stats, leaders include only qualifiers. Qualified hitters must have 2.70 plate appearances per team game. Per NWL standards, qualified pitchers must have minimum .80 innings pitched per team game. This significantly limits the pool of those qualifying for pitching rate stats.

=== Hitting ===
Stat	Player	Team	Total
H	Mike Boeve	Huskies	84
HR	Alex Iadisernia	Mallards	10
RBI	Chris Monroe	Pit Spitters	59
AVG	Justin Janas	Kingfish	.402
OPS	Justin Janas	Kingfish	1.031
SB	Chandler Simpson	Dock Spiders	55

=== Pitching ===
Stat	Player	Team	Total
ERA	Nolan Pender	MoonDogs	2.43
W	Nolan Pender	Moondogs	8
SO	Brant Alazaus	Honkers	67
SV	Tommy Peltier	Jackrabbits	10

== All-Star selections ==
=== Mid-season All-Star Game ===
The 2021 NWL mid-season All-Star Game was played on 7/20/21 at ISG Field in Mankato, Minnesota. The following players were selected to participate in the All-Star game.

Great Lakes Division

Hitters
Position	Player	Team
C	Kirk Liebert	Kingfish
C	Cam Redding	Kingfish
1B	Justin Janas	Kingfish
2B	Chandler Simpson	Dock Spiders
3B	Max Wagner	Booyah
SS	Chase Meidroth	Jackrabbits
UTL	Chris Monroe	Pit Spitters
UTL	Drake Baldwin	Mallards
UTL	Griffin Doersching	Chinooks
OF	Phil Matulia	Rivets
OF	McKay Barney	Kingfish
OF	Kevin Kilpatrick	Woodchucks
OF	Tyler Kehoe	Woodchucks
OF	Alex Iadisernia	Mallards
OF	McKinley Erves	Rafters

Pitchers
Position	Player	Team
P	Adam Wheaton	Growlers
P	Tanner Knapp	Growlers
P	Brock Weirather	Kingfish
P	Theo Denlinger	Mallards
P	Jeremy Neff	Pit Spitters
P	John Beuckelaere	Pit Spitters
P	Brayden Bonner	Rafters
P	Nate Thomas	Dock Spiders
P	Carlson Reed	Dock Spiders
P	Tucker Shalley	Rivets
P	Evan Gates	Pit Spitters
P	Burrell Jones	Bombers

Great Plains Division

Hitters
Position	Player	Team
C	Caleb Ricketts	Rox
C	Connor Burns	Express
1B	Garrett McGowan	Bucks
2B	Otto Kemp	Rox
3B	Mac Horvath	Honkers
SS	Kam'ron Willman	Larks
UTL	Mike Boeve	Huskies
UTL	Reid Homan	Stingers
OF	Kyle Casper	Loggers
OF	Matt Higgins	MoonDogs
OF	Max Jung-Goldberg	Bucks
OF	Jaxon Rosencranz	Larks
OF	Ambren Voitik	Huskies
OF	Andrew Pinckney	Rox

Pitchers
Position	Player	Team
P	Ryan Bourassa	Larks
P	Eli Sundquist	Huskies
P	Blake Reilly	MoonDogs
P	Jacob Webb	Stingers
P	Ryan Watson	Stingers
P	Ryan Duffy	Bucks
P	Kevin Davis	Rox
P	Brant Alazaus	Honkers
P	Nick Herold	Express
P	Will McEntire	Huskies
P	Seth Brewer	Larks
P	Nolan Pender	MoonDogs
P	Duke Benge	Mud Puppies

=== Full-season All-Stars ===
After the season concluded, the league announced its Post-Season All-Stars for the full regular season. This group included players who performed well over the course of the entire season. Several players were selected to both the mid-season All-Star Game and the Post-Season All-Star team.

Great Lakes Division

Hitters
Position	Player	Team
C	Drake Baldwin	Mallards
C	Kirk Liebert	Kingfish
1B	Justin Janas	Kingfish
2B	Chandler Simpson	Dock Spiders
3B	Chase Meidroth	Jackrabbits
SS	Jackson Loftin	Dock Spiders
OF	Alex Iadisernia	Mallards
OF	Phil Matulia	Rivets
OF	Kevin Kilpatrick	Woodchucks
DH	Chris Monroe	Pit Spitters

Pitchers
Position	Player	Team
P	Adam Wheaton	Growlers
P	Cam Schuelke	Pit Spitters
P	Brayden Bonner	Rafters
P	Tyler Hoeft	Woodchucks
P	Logan Lee	Booyah
P	Tommy Peltier	Jackrabbits

Great Plains Division

Hitters
Position	Player	Team
C	Caleb Ricketts	Rox
1B	Ronnie Sweeny	Loggers
2B	Otto Kemp	Rox
3B	Mike Boeve	Huskies
SS	Josh Kasevich	Bucks
OF	Max Jung-Goldberg	Bucks
OF	Matt Higgins	MoonDogs
OF	Will Hamiter	Stingers
DH	Garrett McGowan	Bucks

Pitchers
Position	Player	Team
P	Hunter Dollander	Rox
P	Josh Gainer	Rox
P	Blake Reilly	MoonDogs
P	Will McEntire	Huskies
P	Vince Reilly	MoonDogs
P	Brant Alazaus	Honkers

== NWL alumni in MLB ==
=== MLB players who played in the NWL in 2021 ===
The following is a list of players who appeared in the NWL during the 2021 season, en route to a future appearance/career in MLB.

Name	2021 NWL team	MLB debut	MLB debut team
Victor Scott II	Fond du Lac Dock Spiders	3/28/2024	St. Louis Cardinals
Ryan Loutos	Fond du Lac Dock Spiders	6/1/2024	St. Louis Cardinals
Blake Dunn	Kalamazoo Growlers	6/4/2024	Cincinnati Reds
Jacob Wilson	Mankato MoonDogs	7/19/2024	Oakland Athletics
Drake Baldwin	Madison Mallards	3/27/2025	Atlanta Braves
Chase Meidroth	Kokomo Jackrabbits	4/11/2025	Chicago White Sox
Caleb Durbin	Fond du Lac Dock Spiders	4/18/2025	Milwaukee Brewers
Chandler Simpson	Fond du Lac Dock Spiders	4/19/2025	Tampa Bay Rays
Jack Winkler	St. Cloud Rox	5/31/2025	Miami Marlins
Kyle Teel	Wisconsin Rapids Rafters	6/6/2025	Chicago White Sox
Otto Kemp	St. Cloud Rox	6/7/2025	Philadelphia Phillies
Brice Matthews	St. Cloud Rox	7/11/2025	Houston Astros
Jakob Marsee	Kokomo Jackrabbits	8/1/2025	Miami Marlins
CJ Kayfus	Wisconsin Woodchucks	8/2/2025	Cleveland Guardians
Hayden Harris	Wisconsin Rapids Rafters	9/2/2025	Atlanta Braves
Zach Cole	Rochester Honkers	9/12/2025	Houston Astros
Tyler Schweitzer	Lakeshore Chinooks	4/8/2026	Chicago White Sox
Duncan Davitt	Waterloo Bucks	4/10/2026	Chicago White Sox
Riley Cornelio	St. Cloud Rox	4/24/2026	Washington Nationals
John Klein	Willmar Stingers	5/2/2026	Minnesota Twins
Brycen Mautz	Waterloo Bucks	5/25/2026	St. Louis Cardinals
LuJames Groover	Wisconsin Woodchucks	6/5/2026	Arizona Diamondbacks
Andrew Pinckney	St. Cloud Rox	8/5/2026	Washington Nationals
Brett Bateman	Willmar Stingers	8/7/2026	Toronto Blue Jays

=== Alums with 2021 MLB debuts ===
The following is a list of NWL alums who made their Major League Baseball debuts in the 2021 MLB season.

Name	MLB debut	Debut team	Former NWL team(s)	Season(s) in NWL
Ka'ai Tom	4/1	Athletics	Woodchucks	2014
Zach Pop	4/3	Marlins	Rox	2015
Sam Clay	4/7	Nationals	MoonDogs	2013
Luke Raley	4/9	Mariners	Chinooks	2015
Ty Tice	4/9	Blue Jays	Stingers	2016
Jason Vosler	4/24	Giants	Border Cats	2013
Louis Head	4/25	Rays	Express	2009
Zac Lowther	4/25	Orioles	Chinooks	2015
Jay Flaa	4/27	Orioles	Rox	2013
Lucas Gilbreath	5/1	Rockies	Rox	2015
Hunter Owen	5/5	Pirates	Bullfrogs	2016
Owen Miller	5/23	Indians	Chinooks	2016-17
Riley Adams	6/8	Blue Jays	Loggers	2015
Griffin Jax	6/8	Twins	Express	2015
Ernie Clement	6/13	Indians	Rafters	2015
Matt Vierling	6/19	Phillies	Mallards	2016
Lars Nootbaar	6/22	Cardinals	Loggers	2016
Taylor Gushue	6/30	Cubs	Mallards	2012
Drew Ellis	7/30	Diamondbacks	Honkers	2016
Greg Deichmann	8/6	Cubs	Chinooks	2015
Jacob Robson	8/12	Tigers	Border Cats	2014
Ryan Dorow	8/26	Rangers	Bombers	2016
Nick Fortes	9/18	Marlins	Dock Spiders	2017
TJ Friedl	9/18	Reds	Rox	2016

=== Awards and highlights ===
NWL alums selected the 2021 MLB All-Star Game:

- Pete Alonso (Madison Mallards, 2014)
- Brandon Crawford (Mankato MoonDogs, 2005)
- Mark Melancon (Duluth Huskies, 2004)
- Max Scherzer (La Crosse Loggers, 2004)
- Marcus Semien (Alexandria Beetles, 2009–10)

NWL alums awarded with a 2021 Gold Glove:

- Harrison Bader (Lakeshore Chinooks, 2012)
- Matt Chapman (La Crosse Loggers, 2012)
- Brandon Crawford (Mankato MoonDogs, 2005)
- Marcus Semien (Alexandria Beetles, 2009–10)

NWL alums awarded with a 2021 Silver Slugger:

- Marcus Semien (Alexandria Beetles, 2009–10)

== See also ==
- 2021 Major League Baseball season
