= 2019 Northwoods League season =

26th annual season of the Northwoods League

- League: Northwoods League
- Sport: Baseball
- Teams: 22

Northwoods League Championship
- Champions: Traverse City Pit Spitters
- Runners-up: Eau Claire Express

Seasons
- ← 2018 2020 →

The 2019 Northwoods League season was the 26th season of baseball in the Northwoods League, a collegiate summer baseball organization. The season concluded in August with the Traverse City Pit Spitters winning the championship in their first season.

== Season overview ==
=== Background ===
Ahead of the 2019 season, the Northwoods League (NWL) expanded by two. The Frontier League's Traverse City Beach Bums franchise was transferred, although renamed to the Pit Spitters after the move. The Kokomo Jackrabbits were brought over from the Prospect League, name retained, and were the first NWL team in Indiana. Also in 2019, the Green Bay Bullfrogs changed their nickname and played as the Green Bay Booyah.

In response to the increased number of teams and new geographic implications, the league realigned for 2019, going from two divisions (North and South) to two divisions (Great Plains and Great Lakes) with East and West subdivisions within each. The playoff structure was also changed. The one-game quarterfinal was replaced with a best-of-three series, and the best-of-three championship series was replaced with a single League Championship game. 2019 was also the first season in which the NWL implemented the rule of extra innings starting with a runner on second base. Although this rule had not yet reached MLB in 2019, it was being used in affiliated Minor League Baseball as well as other leagues.

=== Season ===
The regular season began on May 28, with the season split into two halves, and the top two teams in each sub-division—the standings leader from each half—qualified for the playoffs.

The playoff qualifiers for each subdivision were as follows:

- Great Lakes East - Traverse City Pit Spitters and Kalamazoo Growlers
- Great Lakes West - Madison Mallards and Wisconsin Rapids Rafters
- Great Plains East - Eau Claire Express and Waterloo Bucks
- Great Plains West - Willmar Stingers and St. Cloud Rox

In the four best-of-three subdivision series, the Pit Spitters swept the Growlers, the Mallards swept the Rafters, the Express swept the Bucks, and the Stingers swept the Rox. In the single-game Great Lakes Division championship, the Pit Spitters defeated the Mallards. In the Great Plains, the Express defeated the Stingers.

The NWL Championship game was held at Pit Spitters Park in Chums Corner, Michigan on 8/16/19. The Express scored first, putting up two runs in the first inning when Sam Kohnle hit a two-RBI single off Chad Patrick. The Pit Spitters put up a run in the 5th, but were trailing 2-1 heading into the bottom of the 9th inning. After two walks, a throwing error on a bunt single allowed the Pit Spitters to tie the score at 2. Another walk loaded the based, but Express pitcher Brandon Dieter retired the next two batters. Traverse City's Andrew Morrow hit a ground ball to third base, but an errant throw allowed Adam Proctor to score, sealing the walk-off victory for Traverse City.

=== Individual achievements ===
Justice Bigbie of the Madison Mallards was named 2019 NWL Most Valuable Player. Bigbie hit .349 across 68 games (322 plate appearances), leading the league in RBI (70) collecting 12 home runs. In the NWL All-Star Game, he hit two home runs and was selected as the MVP of the game.

Andrew Hoffman of the Traverse City Pit Spitters was named 2019 NWL Pitcher of the Year. He appeared in 12 games (58.1 innings) and had eight wins, 43 strikeouts and a league-best 1.08 ERA

In the 2019 Major League Baseball draft, 166 former NWL players were selected by MLB teams. Bryson Stott was the highest-selected alum, going to the Philadelphia Phillies with the 14th pick. Stott had played for the Wisconsin Rapids Rafters in 2017. Other first round picks were Michael Busch (St. Cloud, '17) who was taken by the Los Angeles Dodgers at pick 31 and Korey Lee (La Crosse, '17-'18), taken by the Houston Astros a pick later.

== Standings ==
=== Great Lakes Division ===
Great Lakes East Sub-Division Regular Season Standings
Pos	Team	W	L	Pct.
1	x – Traverse City Pit Spitters	52	20	.722
2	x – Kalamazoo Growlers	37	35	.514
3	Kenosha Kingfish	34	38	.472
4	Rockford Rivets	33	39	.458
5	Kokomo Jackrabbits	29	42	.408
6	Battle Creek Bombers	23	49	.319

Great Lakes West Sub-Division Regular Season Standings
Pos	Team	W	L	Pct.
1	x –Wisconsin Rapids Rafters	46	26	.639
2	x – Madison Mallards	42	30	.583
3	Fond du Lac Dock Spiders	36	35	.507
4	Wisconsin Woodchucks	34	38	.472
5	Green Bay Booyah	33	39	.458
6	Lakeshore Chinooks	32	40	.444

=== Great Plains Division ===
Great Plains East Sub-Division Regular Season Standings
Pos	Team	W	L	Pct.
1	x – Eau Claire Express	40	30	.571
2	La Crosse Loggers	37	35	.514
3	x – Waterloo Bucks	34	35	.493
4	Duluth Huskies	29	38	.433
5	Thunder Bay Border Cats	24	47	.338

Great Plains West Sub-Division Regular Season Standings
Pos	Team	W	L	Pct.
1	x – St. Cloud Rox	44	28	.611
2	x – Willmar Stingers	40	32	.556
3	Rochester Honkers	38	34	.528
4	Mankato MoonDogs	36	36	.500
5	Bismarck Larks	32	40	.444

- x – Qualified for playoffs based on best record in either first or second half of season

== Playoffs ==
=== Format ===
First and second half sub-divisional winners were eligible for the playoffs. The two playoff-eligible teams in each sub-division competed in a best-of-three Sub-Divisional Series. The two Sub-Divisional Series winners played a one-game Divisional Championship Game. The two Divisional Championship Game winners played a one-game League Championship.

=== Playoff bracket ===
Sub-Division Championship Series
Traverse City
Kalamazoo
↑ Great Lakes East / ↓ Great Lakes West
Madison
Wisconsin Rapids
↑ Great Lakes / ↓ Great Plains
Eau Claire
Waterloo
↑ Great Plains East / ↓ Great Plains West
Willmar
St. Cloud

Division Championship
Traverse City
Madison
Eau Claire
Willmar

Northwoods League Championship
Traverse City
Eau Claire

== Statistical leaders ==
Qualified hitters must have minimum of 71 at-bats per season.

=== Hitting ===
Stat	Player	Team	Total
H	Justice Bigbie, Jordan Barth	Mallards, Rox	98 (tie)
HR	Ryan Holgate	Loggers	13
RBI	Justice Bigbie	Mallards	70
AVG	Brennan McKenzie	Stingers	.386
OPS	Brennan McKenzie	Stingers	1.055
SB	Wyatt Ulrich	Larks	32

=== Pitching ===
Stat	Player	Team	Total
W	Andrew Hoffman, Polo Portela	Pit Spitters, Stingers	8 (tie)
SO	Aaron Husson	Jackrabbits	69
SV	Keon Taylor, Theo Denlinger	Honkers, Mallards	12 (tie)

== All-Star selections ==
=== Mid-season All-Star Game ===
The 2019 NWL mid-season All-Star Game was played on 7/16/19 at Riverfront Stadium in Waterloo, Iowa. The following players were selected to participate in the All-Star game.

Great Lakes Division

Hitters
Position	Player	Team
C	Logan Michaels	Mallards
C	Jake Dunham	Rafters
1B	Justice Bigbie	Mallards
2B	Byron Murray	Woodchucks
3B	Adam Frank	Woodchucks
SS	Michael Slaten	Pit Spitters
INF	Timo Schau	Mallards
INF	Drew Williams	Mallards
INF	Nate Thomas	Kingfish
DH	Andrew Bullock	Dock Spiders
DH	Josh Sears	Bombers
OF	Drew Benefield	Mallards
OF	Brandon Seitzer	Woodchucks
OF	Richie Schiekofer	Rafters
OF	Zeb Adreon	Dock Spiders
OF	Ben Anderson	Mallards

Pitchers
Position	Player	Team
P	Lowell Schipper	Mallards
P	Neil Abbatiello	Rafters
P	Andrew Hoffman	Pit Spitters
P	Matt Osterberg	Rafters
P	Michael Dunkleberger	Growlers
P	Blaine Traxel	Jackrabbits
P	Kyle Jones	Pit Spitters
P	Jimmy Burnette	Rivets
P	Brad Littleton	Rivets
P	Will Klein	Chinooks
P	Ryan Boyer	Jackrabbits
P	A.J. Archambo	Mallards
P	Theo Denlinger	Mallards
P	Tanner Lane	Booyah

Great Plains Division

Hitters
Position	Player	Team
C	Alonzo Rubalcaba	Bucks
C	Ryan Wrobleski	Honkers
1B	Tristan Peterson	Honkers
2B	Matt Bottcher	Express
3B	Troy Beilsmith	Express
SS	Evan Berkey	Honkers
SS	Zack Gregory	Larks
INF	Daniel Walsh	Stingers
INF	Nick Kent	Huskies
DH	Dylan Phillips	Bucks
OF	Garett Delano	Rox
OF	Ryan Holgate	Loggers
OF	Wyatt Ulrich	Larks
OF	Spencer Myers	Express
OF	Justin King	Stingers

Pitchers
Position	Player	Team
P	Polo Portela	Stingers
P	R.J. Martinez	Rox
P	Ryan Middendorf	Honkers
P	Dane Morrow	Huskies
P	Keon Taylor	Honkers
P	Tyler Lesley	MoonDogs
P	Dom Arias	Larks
P	Joe Moran	Border Cats
P	Jared Frielich	Loggers
P	Trevor Koenig	Rox
P	Jimmy Smiley	Bucks
P	Noah DeNoyer	Express
P	Brannon Jordan	Express
P	Hunter Kloke	Larks
P	Garret Rukes	Stingers

=== Full-season All-Stars ===
After the season concluded, the league announced its Post-Season All-Stars for the full regular season. This group included players who performed well over the course of the entire season. Several players were selected to both the mid-season All-Star Game and the Post-Season All-Star team.

Great Lakes Division

Hitters
Position	Player	Team
C	Jake Dunham	Rafters
1B	Shea Kramer	Growlers
2B	Mario Camilletti	Pit Spitters
3B	Andrew Morrow	Pit Spitters
SS	Daryl Myers	Chinooks
OF	Justice Bigbie	Mallards
OF	Michael Slaten	Pit Spitters
OF	Richie Schiekofer	Rafters
DH	Brandon Chinea	Jackrabbits

Pitchers
Position	Player	Team
P	Andrew Hoffman	Pit Spitters
P	Gareth Stroh	Rafters
P	Theo Denlinger	Mallards
P	Jack Mahoney	Booyah
P	Kyle Jones	Pit Spitters
P	Brayden Bonner	Rafters

Great Plains Division

Hitters
Position	Player	Team
C	Alonzo Rubalcaba	Bucks
1B	J.T. Schwartz	Loggers
2B	Matt Bottcher	Express
3B	Jordan Barth	Rox
SS	Evan Berkey	Honkers
OF	Garett Delano	Rox
OF	Ryan Holgate	Loggers
OF	Josh Elvir	MoonDogs
DH	Patrick Ferguson	Bucks

Pitchers
Position	Player	Team
P	Polo Portela	Stingers
P	R.J. Martinez	Rox
P	Keon Taylor	Honkers
P	Jared Frielich	Loggers
P	Trevor Koenig	Rox
P	Brett Newberg	MoonDogs

== NWL alumni in MLB ==
=== MLB players who played in the NWL in 2019 ===
The following is a list of players who appeared in the NWL during the 2019 season, en route to a future appearance/career in MLB.

Name	2019 NWL team	MLB debut	MLB debut team
Gavin Stone	Battle Creek Bombers	5/3/2023	Los Angeles Dodgers
Grant Hartwig	Lakeshore Chinooks	6/19/2023	New York Mets
Zack Gelof	Kalamazoo Growlers	7/14/2023	Oakland Athletics
Wade Meckler	Duluth Huskies	8/14/2023	San Francisco Giants
Luke Little	Traverse City Pit Spitters	9/6/2023	Chicago Cubs
Will Klein	Lakeshore Chinooks	4/28/2024	Kansas City Royals
Chris Roycroft	Green Bay Booyah	5/7/2024	St. Louis Cardinals
Chad Patrick	Traverse City Pit Spitters	3/29/2025	Milwaukee Brewers
Logan VanWey	Duluth Huskies	4/11/2025	Houston Astros
Caleb Durbin	Rockford Rivets	4/18/2025	Milwaukee Brewers
Tim Elko	Fond du Lac Dock Spiders	5/10/2025	Chicago White Sox
Colton Gordon	Kenosha Kingfish	5/14/2025	Houston Astros
Denzel Clarke	Kokomo Jackrabbits	5/23/2025	Athletics
Andrew Hoffman	Traverse City Pit Spitters	5/30/2025	Kansas City Royals
Alex Carrillo	St. Cloud Rox	7/8/2025	New York Mets
Dugan Darnell	Rockford Rivets	8/1/2025	Colorado Rockies
Hayden Juenger	Mankato MoonDogs	5/31/2026	Toronto Blue Jays
Mike Paredes	Kalamazoo Growlers	5/31/2026	Minnesota Twins
Jack Sinclair	Wisconsin Rapids Rafters	9/4/2026	Washington Nationals

=== Alums with 2019 MLB debuts ===
The following is a list of NWL alums who made their Major League Baseball debuts in the 2019 MLB season.

Name	MLB debut	Debut team	Former NWL team(s)	Season(s) in NWL
Pete Alonso	3/28	Mets	Mallards	2014
Nick Anderson	3/28	Marlins	Lunkers	2010
Connor Joe	3/28	Giants	Huskies	2012
Jake Noll	3/30	Nationals	Chinooks	2014
Josh Fuentes	4/6	Rockies	MoonDogs	2013
Joe Harvey	4/10	Yankees	Lunkers	2011
Matt Beaty	4/30	Dodgers	Beetles, Bullfrogs	2012, 2014
Anthony Bemboom	5/12	Rays	Stingers	2010-11
Shaun Anderson	5/15	Giants	Chinooks	2014
Kyle Garlick	5/19	Dodgers	Honkers	2012
Josh Smith	5/25	Indians	River Bats	2010
Jacob Waguespack	5/27	Blue Jays	Bombers	2014
Josh Taylor	5/29	Red Sox	Rox	2014
Colin Poche	6/8	Rays	Stingers	2013
Sean Poppen	6/19	Twins	Huskies	2014
Tony Gonsolin	6/26	Dodgers	Mallards	2015
Alex Young	6/27	Diamondbacks	Chinooks	2014
Matt Thaiss	7/3	Angels	Mallards	2014
Ryan Court	7/26	Mariners	Border Cats	2010
Sam Selman	8/1	Giants	MoonDogs	2010-11
John Schreiber	8/9	Tigers	Growlers	2014
A.J. Puk	8/21	Athletics	Bucks	2014
Rico Garcia	8/27	Rockies	Kingfish	2014-15
Sam Haggerty	9/4	Mets	Express	2013
Tyler Heineman	9/4	Blue Jays	Woodchucks	2011
Seth Mejias-Brean	9/4	Padres	Loggers	2010
Nico Hoerner	9/9	Cubs	Mallards	2016

=== Awards and highlights ===
NWL alums selected the 2019 MLB All-Star Game:

- Pete Alonso (Madison Mallards, 2014)
- Matt Chapman (La Crosse Loggers, 2012)
- Paul DeJong (Wisconsin Woodchucks, 2014)
- Max Scherzer (La Crosse Loggers, 2004)

NWL alums awarded with MLB Rookie of the Year award:

- Pete Alonso (Madison Mallards, 2014)

NWL alums awarded with a 2019 Gold Glove:

- Matt Chapman (La Crosse Loggers, 2012)

NWL alums awarded with a 2019 Silver Slugger:

- Mitch Garver (St. Cloud River Bats, 2010–11)

NWL alums who were members of the World Series-winning Washington Nationals:

- Max Scherzer (La Crosse Loggers, 2004)

== See also ==
- 2019 Major League Baseball season
