= 2013 Northwoods League season =

21st annual season of the Northwoods League

- League: Northwoods League
- Sport: Baseball
- Teams: 16

Northwoods League Championship
- Champions: Madison Mallards
- Runners-up: Duluth Huskies

Seasons
- ← 2012 2014 →

The 2013 Northwoods League season was the 20th season of baseball in the Northwoods League, a collegiate summer baseball organization. The season concluded in August with the Madison Mallards winning the championship.

== Season overview ==
=== Background ===
In the 2013 season, the Northwoods League (NWL) had sixteen teams, split evenly between a North and South Division. The North contained all teams from Minnesota, Iowa, and Ontario, while the South contained all from Wisconsin and Michigan. The La Crosse Loggers entered the season as defending champions, having defeated the Mankato MoonDogs in the 2012 NWL championship series.

Although there were no expansion teams from 2012 going into 2013, the Alexandria Beetles were sold to a new ownership group. The new group changed the team identity to the Blue Anchors and developed new logos and branding materials.

=== Season ===
The regular season began in May, with the season split into two halves. The teams with the best records in the division for each half automatically qualified for a playoff berth. This resulted in four teams qualifying for the playoffs.

The playoff qualifiers for each division were as follows:

- North Division - Waterloo Bucks, Duluth Huskies
- South Division - Lakeshore Chinooks, Madison Mallards

In the two best-of-two semifinal playoff games, the Huskies beat the Bucks and the Mallards beat the Chinooks. The championship series was a best-of-three set between the Huskies and the Mallards. The Mallards swept the Huskies and claimed their second NWL title.

=== Individual highlights ===
Marc Flores of the Willmar Stingers and Keith Curcio were named 2013 NWL Co-Most Valuable Players. Flores appeared in 67 games for the Stingers, maintaining a .352 batting average and 1.006 OPS. Curcio appeared in 68 games for the Huskies, batting .367 (.913 OPS) with 102 hits and 28 stolen bases. Clay Chapman of the Huskies was named 2013 NWL Pitcher of the Year. Across 72.1 innings of work, Chapman held down a 1.99 ERA and struck out 66 batters.

Other batters who turned in impressive seasons include Andrew Stevenson, Joe McCarthy, and Jason Vosler. Other pitchers include Colin Poche, J.P. Feyereisen, Steven Brault, and Sam Clay.

While playing for the Lakeshore Chinooks, future MLB outfielder Harrison Bader lived with Craig Counsell and his family at their home in Whitefish Bay, Wisconsin.

In the 2013 Major League Baseball draft, 148 former NWL players were selected by MLB teams. Hunter Dozier was the highest-selected alum, going to the Kansas City Royals with the 8th overall pick. Dozier had played for the Willmar Stingers in 2012. Other first rounders were Jonathan Crawford (Madison, 2011) who was taken by the Detroit Tigers at pick #20 and Phillip Ervin (Green Bay, 2011) who was selected by the Cincinnati Reds at pick #27. Others selected in the draft include Tony Kemp (Rochester, 2011) and Mitch Garver (St. Cloud, 2010-11).

== Standings ==
North Division
Pos	Team	W	L	Pct.
1	x – Waterloo Bucks	51	19	.729
2	x – Duluth Huskies	43	27	.614
3	Willmar Stingers	41	29	.586
4	Mankato MoonDogs	38	32	.543
5	St. Cloud Rox	36	34	.514
6	Rochester Honkers	28	42	.400
7	Alexandria Blue Anchors	24	46	.343
8	Thunder Bay Border Cats	21	49	.300

South Division
Pos	Team	W	L	Pct.
1	x – Lakeshore Chinooks	44	26	.629
2	La Crosse Loggers	43	27	.614
3	x – Madison Mallards	41	29	.586
4	Eau Claire Express	33	37	.471
5	Wisconsin Rapids Rafters	31	39	.443
6	Battle Creek Bombers	29	41	.414
7	Wisconsin Woodchucks	29	41	.414
8	Green Bay Bullfrogs	28	42	.400

- x – Qualified for playoffs based on either best record (first or second half of season) or as a wildcard due to overall record.

== Statistical leaders ==
Qualified hitters must have minimum of 71 at-bats per season.

=== Hitting ===
Stat	Player	Team	Total
H	Keith Curcio	Huskies	102
HR	Michael Katz	Loggers	18
RBI	Drew Weeks	Mallards	67
AVG	John La Prise	Mallards	.407
OPS	J.M. Twichell	MoonDogs	1.082
SB	Tim Arakawa	MoonDogs	30

=== Pitching ===
Stat	Player	Team	Total
IP	Brad Stroik	Rafters	84.1
SO	Josh Frye	Loggers	79
SV	Jess Amedee	MoonDogs	13

== NWL alumni in MLB ==
=== MLB players who played in the NWL in 2013 ===
The following is a list of players who appeared in the NWL during the 2013 season, en route to a future appearance/career in MLB.

Name	2013 NWL team(s)
Alex Call	Eau Claire Express
Brock Stewart	Madison Mallards
Steven Brault	Willmar Stingers
Andrew Stevenson	Lakeshore Chinooks
Harrison Bader	Lakeshore Chinooks
Eric Stout	Waterloo Bucks
Alex McRae	St. Cloud Rox
Eric Hanhold	Lakeshore Chinooks
Josh Fuentes	Mankato MoonDogs
Colin Poche	Willmar Stingers
Sam Haggerty	Eau Claire Express
Joe McCarthy	Madison Mallards
J.P. Feyereisen	Wisconsin Rapids Rafters
Brooks Kriske	La Crosse Loggers
Sam Clay	Mankato MoonDogs
Jason Vosler	Thunder Bay Border Cats
Jay Flaa	St. Cloud Rox
Danny Young	Wisconsin Woodchucks

=== Alums with 2013 MLB debuts ===
The following is a list of NWL alums who made their Major League Baseball debuts in the 2013 MLB season.

Name	MLB debut	Debut team	Former NWL team(s)	Season(s) in NWL
Josh Prince	4/6	Brewers	Bullfrogs	2008
Hiram Burgos	4/20	Brewers	Blue Thunder	2006
Jermaine Curtis	4/27	Cardinals	Beetles	2006
Evan Reed	5/16	Tigers	Bucks	2005
Brandon Bantz	6/8	Mariners	Bucks	2007
Tony Sanchez	6/23	Pirates	Bombers	2007
Sean Halton	6/27	Brewers	MoonDogs	2006
Jonathan Diaz	6/29	Red Sox	Border Cats	2005
Vic Black	7/25	Pirates	Loggers	2007
Cody Asche	7/30	Philles	Huskies	2009-10
Roger Kieschnick	7/31	Giants	River Bats	2006
Kevin Pillar	8/14	Blue Jays	Woodchucks	2010
Philip Gosselin	8/16	Braves	Mallards	2008
Jake Petricka	8/22	White Sox	MoonDogs	2009
Ryan Goins	8/23	Blue Jays	Bucks	2008
Brian Flynn	9/4	Marlins	Honkers	2009, 2011
Erik Johnson	9/4	White Sox	Beetles	2009
Marcus Semien	9/4	White Sox	Beetles	2009-10
Zach Walters	9/6	Nationals	Huskies	2009

=== Awards and highlights ===
NWL alums selected the 2013 MLB All-Star Game:

- Allen Craig (Alexandria Beetles, 2003/2005)
- Mark Melancon (Duluth Huskies, 2004)
- Chris Sale (La Crosse Loggers, 2008)
- Max Scherzer (La Crosse Loggers, 2004)
- Jordan Zimmermann (Eau Claire Express, 2006)
- Ben Zobrist (Wisconsin Woodchucks, 2003)

NWL alums who earned a 2013 Cy Young Award:

- Max Scherzer (La Crosse Loggers, 2004)

== See also ==
- 2013 Major League Baseball season
