= Rockford Rivets =

American collegiate baseball team

- Logo

Information
- League: Northwoods League (Great Lakes East 2019-pres) (South Division 2016-2018)
- Location: Loves Park, Illinois
- Ballpark: Rivets Stadium
- Founded: 2015
- Division championships: 1
- League championships: 0
- Colors: Black, gold, silver, white, dark gray, red
- Ownership: David Casey; Todd Kolosso
- Management: General Manager: Hanna Snedecor
- Manager: Bob Koopmann
- Website: RockfordRivets.com

The Rockford Rivets are a baseball team in the Northwoods League, a collegiate summer baseball league. The league's only team based in Illinois, their home games are played at Rivets Stadium in Loves Park.

== History ==
Following the demise of the Frontier League's Rockford Aviators, the Northwoods League officially announced that Rockford Baseball Properties, LLC (composed of league president Dick Radatz, Jr. and Chad Bauer) would field a team in the league to begin play in the 2016 season. Northern Illinois Huskies baseball and Madison Mallards alumnus Brian Smith served as the team's first manager. In February 2016, the Rivets name, logo and colors were officially announced.

== Seasons ==
| Season | Record | Win % | Finish | Manager | Playoffs |
|---|---|---|---|---|---|
| 2016 | 33-39 | .458 | 6th in South | Brian Smith | Did not qualify |
| 2017 | 39-33 | .541 | 3rd in South | Brian Smith | Lost in quarter-finals (0-1) to Battle Creek Bombers |
| 2018 | 28-43 | .338 | 9th in South | Brian Smith | Did not qualify |
| 2019 | 33-39 | .458 | 4th in Great Lakes East | Josh Keim | Did not qualify |
| 2020 | 16-27 | .372 | 3rd in WI-IL East | Josh Keim | No playoffs due to COVID |
| 2021 | 29-42 | .408 | 4th in Great Lakes East | JT Scarra | Did not qualify |
| 2022 | 37-35 | .514 | 2nd in Great Lakes East | JT Scarra | Did not qualify |
| 2023 | 45-27 | .625 | 2nd in Great Lakes East | Vincent Tornincasa | Did not qualify |
| 2024 | 47-25 | .623 | 1st in Great Lakes East | Will Oberg | Lost in quarter-finals (1-2) to Kalamazoo Growlers |
| 2025 | 26-43 | .377 | 6th in Great Lakes East | Chase Brewster | Did not qualify |
| 2026 | 31-40 | .437 | 5th in Great Lakes East | Bob Koopmann | Did not qualify |

== MLB alumni ==
| Name | MLB teams played for | Years with Rivets | MLB Debut |
|---|---|---|---|
| Jordan Wicks | Chicago Cubs | 2020 | August 26, 2023 |
| Hunter Feduccia | Los Angeles Dodgers, Tampa Bay Rays | 2017 | July 31, 2024 |
| Caleb Durbin | Milwaukee Brewers, Boston Red Sox | 2019 | April 18, 2025 |
| John Rave | Kansas City Royals | 2017 | May 26, 2025 |
| Carson Seymour | San Francisco Giants | 2020 | June 29, 2025 |
| Dugan Darnell | Colorado Rockies | 2019 | August 1, 2025 |
| Bob Seymour | Tampa Bay Rays | 2020 | August 15, 2025 |
| Lucas Spence | Houston Astros | 2024 | July 17, 2026 |
