= Kole Calhoun =

American baseball player (born 1987)

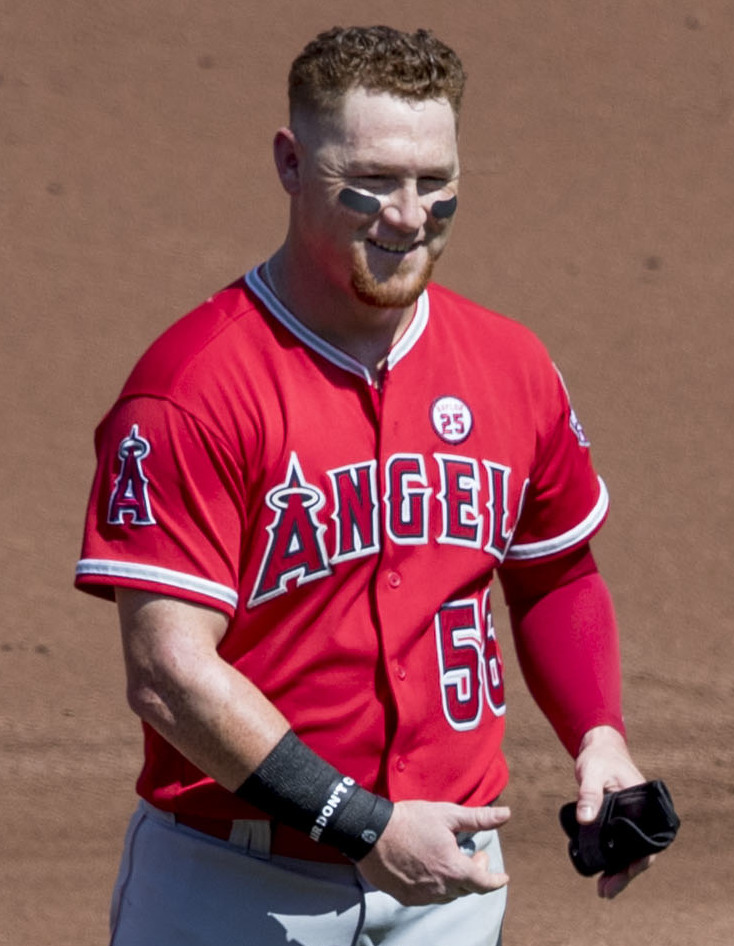
- Calhoun with the Los Angeles Angels in 2017
- Right fielder
- Born: October 14, 1987 (age 38); Tempe, Arizona, U.S.
- Batted: Left Threw: Left

MLB debut
- May 22, 2012, for the Los Angeles Angels

Last MLB appearance
- September 30, 2023, for the Cleveland Guardians

MLB statistics
- Batting average: .242
- Home runs: 179
- Runs batted in: 582
- Stats at Baseball Reference

Teams
- Los Angeles Angels of Anaheim / Los Angeles Angels (2012–2019); Arizona Diamondbacks (2020–2021); Texas Rangers (2022); Cleveland Guardians (2023)

Career highlights and awards
- Gold Glove Award (2015)

Kole Alan Calhoun (born October 14, 1987) is an American former professional baseball right fielder. He played in Major League Baseball (MLB) for the Los Angeles Angels, Arizona Diamondbacks, Texas Rangers, and Cleveland Guardians. Calhoun played college baseball at Yavapai College and Arizona State University. He was drafted by the Angels in the eighth round of the 2010 Major League Baseball draft and made his MLB debut in 2012. He won a Gold Glove Award in 2015.

== Early life ==
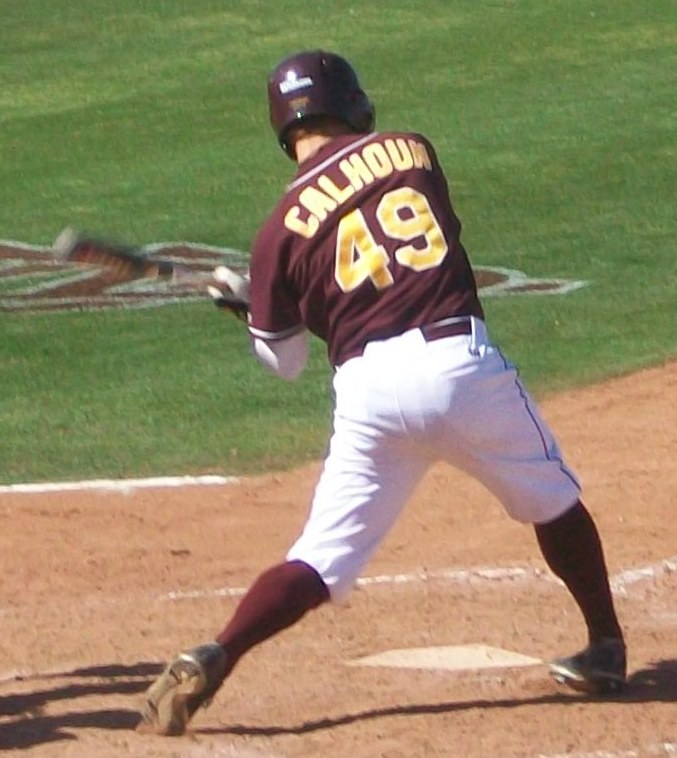
Calhoun with Arizona State in 2009

Calhoun attended Buckeye Union High School in Buckeye, Arizona. In 2005, Calhoun and Sammy Solis were named the West Valley High School Baseball Co-Players of the Year.

== College career ==
Calhoun then attended and played college baseball for Yavapai College and Arizona State University. In 2010, his senior year at Arizona State, he batted .321 with 17 home runs and 59 runs batted in (RBIs) in 61 games for the Arizona State Sun Devils.

In summers between college seasons, he played collegiate wood-bat baseball for the Eau Claire Express of the Northwoods League.

== Professional career ==
=== Draft and minor leagues ===
The Los Angeles Angels of Anaheim selected Calhoun in the eighth round of the 2010 Major League Baseball draft. He was assigned to Rookie League Orem, where in 56 games, he hit .292 with 7 home runs and 42 RBI. He played 2011 with High-A Inland Empire, where in 133 games, he hit .324 with 22 home runs, 99 RBI and a .957 OPS. He also stole 20 bases. He was named to the California League Postseason All-Star team as a utility player. He was the Kenny Myers Minor League Player of the Year in 2011. This monster season earned him a direct promotion to Triple-A Salt Lake to begin 2012. In 43 games prior to his first callup, he hit .296 with 5 home runs and 31 RBI.

=== Los Angeles Angels (2012–2019) ===
On May 21, 2012, Calhoun was recalled by the Angels to replace Vernon Wells, who was placed on the disabled list. He made his debut the next day, and he recorded his first major league hit the day after, a double off of Jarrod Parker. Calhoun was the 8th player from the 2010 MLB draft to make his major-league debut. He was sent back down on June 12 after 8 games with the Angels. He made the Pacific Coast League All-Star team. He had another short stint with the Angels before being called up for good in August. His final stats with the Bees in 105 games were .298 with 14 home runs, 73 RBI, and a .877 OPS. He was used exclusively off the bench in August and September. In 21 games with the Angels, he hit .174 with 1 RBI in just 23 at-bats.

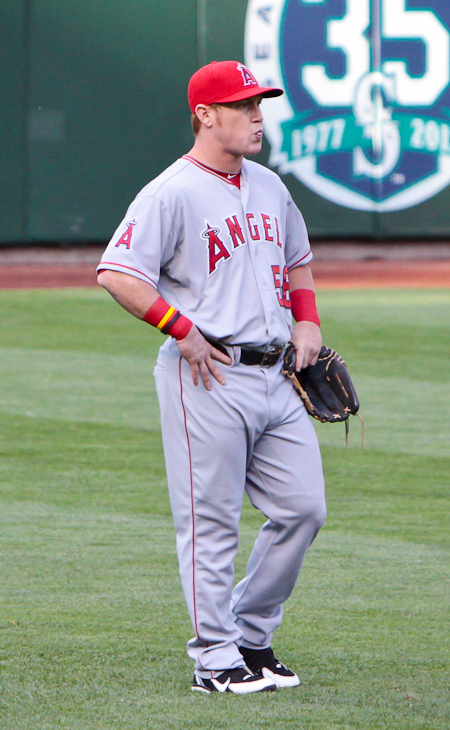
Calhoun with the Angels in 2012

In 2013, Calhoun was competing for the fifth outfielder spot with J. B. Shuck, but after a poor spring training, in which he hit .174 with 10 RBI and 16 strikeouts in 23 games, Shuck won the position, and Calhoun began 2013 with Salt Lake. Calhoun was recalled on July 28 to replace the injured Albert Pujols. Calhoun was hitting .354 with 12 home runs and 49 RBI with Salt Lake. On August 2, Calhoun hit his first major league home run, a two-run, go-ahead shot off of Steve Delabar in the bottom of the 8th inning, part of a 4-hit night for Calhoun. Because Pujols went down, Josh Hamilton received the most time at designated hitter, leaving right field up for grabs. By the time September rolled around, Calhoun won the job, starting the last 21 games of the season there. In 58 games with the Angels in 2013, Calhoun hit .282 with 8 home runs and 32 RBI.

Calhoun was the starting right-fielder entering 2014. However, after just 14 games, Calhoun was placed on the disabled list with a sprained right ankle. By the time he returned on May 21, Collin Cowgill was playing well as the right-fielder, and Calhoun shared some of his starts with Cowgill. For the season, he scored 90 runs, 9th in the AL.

Calhoun played in 159 games for the Angels in 2015, hitting .256 with a career high 26 home runs and 83 RBI, with 164 strikeouts (3rd in the AL). He also played stellar defense in right field, posting a .989 fielding percentage and six defensive runs saved and leading the league in putouts as a right fielder (342) en route to winning his first Rawlings Gold Glove Award.

Despite a slight drop-off in terms of home runs and runs batted in from 2015, Calhoun lowered his strikeout rate and walked more in the 2016 season. Altogether, Calhoun finished batting .271/.348/.438 with 5 triples (10th in the AL), 18 home runs and 75 RBIs in 157 games played.

For the third consecutive season, Calhoun played in over 150 games in 2017. He finished the season batting .244/.333/.392 with 19 home runs, 71 RBIs, and scored 77 runs. For the first half of the 2018 season, Calhoun struggled offensively despite being tied in outfield assists in MLB with 7. He was placed on the disabled list on June 3 with an oblique injury. In the second half, he hit .231 with 10 home runs. Overall, he finished the season hitting a career-low .208/.283/.369 with 19 home runs and 57 RBIs. His four double plays led AL outfielders.

Calhoun began slowly in 2019, but picked it up in the second half of the season, finishing the season with a career high 33 home runs in 152 games. On September 28, Calhoun was Justin Verlander's 3,000th career strikeout, however he reached base on an uncaught third strike and then scored on Andrelton Simmons's home run immediately thereafter.

=== Arizona Diamondbacks (2020–2021) ===
On December 30, 2019, Calhoun signed a two-year contract with the Arizona Diamondbacks with a club option for the 2022 season.

On July 6, 2020, it was announced that Calhoun had tested positive for COVID-19. He was cleared to resume summer training on July 10. Calhoun finished his first season with Arizona leading the team in home runs (16), RBI (40) and runs scored (35). His home run and RBI totals ranked third and ninth in the National League respectively.

On March 3, 2021, Calhoun underwent right knee surgery after suffering a torn meniscus. On April 30, Calhoun underwent another surgery, this time for a split hamstring tendon in his left leg. The injury would sideline him between 6–8 weeks. On May 15, Calhoun was placed on the 60-day injured list. He was activated off of the injured list on July 10. In 2021, he had the slowest sprint speed of all major league right fielders, at 24.7 feet/second.

=== Texas Rangers (2022) ===
On November 30, 2021, Calhoun signed a 1-year, $5.2 M contract with the Texas Rangers.

On May 27, 2022, Calhoun would record his 1,000th hit against Oakland Athletics pitcher, Cole Irvin. He played in 125 games for Texas, slashing .196/.257/.330 with 12 home runs and 49 RBI. On November 8, the Rangers declined Calhoun's $5.5 million option for the 2023 season and he became a free agent.

=== Seattle Mariners (2023) ===
On February 23, 2023, Calhoun signed a minor league contract with the Seattle Mariners organization. On March 26, Calhoun triggered the opt-out clause in his contract and elected free agency.

=== New York Yankees (2023) ===
On April 20, 2023, Calhoun signed a minor league contract with the New York Yankees organization. Calhoun played in 23 games for the Triple-A Scranton/Wilkes-Barre RailRiders, hitting .281/.391/.528 with 4 home runs and 18 RBI. On June 1, he exercised the opt-out clause in his contract, giving the Yankees 48 hours to add him to their 40-man roster or grant him his release. The Yankees declined to add Calhoun to their roster, and he was formally released on June 3.

=== Los Angeles Dodgers (2023) ===
On June 6, 2023, Calhoun signed a minor league contract with the Los Angeles Dodgers organization and was assigned to the Triple-A Oklahoma City Dodgers. In 35 games for the Triple–A Oklahoma City Dodgers, he hit .308/.367/.532 with 5 home runs and 28 RBI.

=== Cleveland Guardians (2023) ===
On August 4, 2023, Calhoun was traded to the Cleveland Guardians and immediately added to the major league roster. In 43 games for Cleveland, he batted .217/.282/.376 with 6 home runs and 25 RBI. Calhoun became a free agent upon the conclusion of the 2023 season.

=== Retirement ===
On March 15, 2024, Calhoun announced his retirement from playing in an Instagram post.

== Personal life ==
Calhoun and his wife, Jennifer, had a son in September 2016, and a daughter in May 2019.

Calhoun grew up an Arizona Diamondbacks and Arizona Cardinals fan.
