= St. Cloud Rox (collegiate summer baseball) =

- Logo

Information
- League: Northwoods League (1994-pres) (Great Plains West Division: 2019-pres) (North Division: 1998-2018)
- Location: St. Cloud, Minnesota
- Ballpark: Joe Faber Field
- Founded: 1994
- Division championships: River Bats: 6 (1998, 1999, 2000, 2001, 2003, 2007); Rox: 5 (2015, 2017, 2021, 2023, 2026)
- League championships: River Bats: (1998, 2000, 2007); Rox: (2017)
- Former name: St. Cloud River Bats (1997–2011); Dubuque Mud Puppies (1994–1996)
- Former ballpark: Dick Putz Field
- Colors: Navy, Carolina blue, red, gray, white, dark red, light navy
- Mascot: Chisel
- Ownership: Rox Local Group: Gary Posch, Joe Sexton, Scott Schreiner
- Manager: Nick Studdard
- Media: St. Cloud Times WJON
- Website: stcloudrox.com

The St. Cloud Rox are a baseball team that play in the Northwoods League, a collegiate summer baseball league. Their home games are played at the Joe Faber Field in St. Cloud, Minnesota.

== Beginnings in Dubuque ==
The franchise was one of the five founding members of the league in 1994 and was located in Dubuque, Iowa. The team was known as the Dubuque Mud Puppies. They played in Dubuque from 1994 to 1996, struggling financially despite strong backing from the business community.

Three seasons in Dubuque yielded three future MLB players: Jeff Weaver, Shawn Sedlacek, and Robb Quinlan. Weaver became the first Northwoods League alum to appear in the majors when he debuted with the Detroit Tigers in 1999.

== Return of baseball to St. Cloud ==
St. Cloud, Minnesota has hosted baseball for decades at a variety of play levels. Baseball returned to the city in 1997 in the Northwoods League with the relocation of the Mud Puppies. With the move came a new name for the team, the St. Cloud River Bats. The River Bats were a premier team in the Northwoods League, winning 3 league championships, one North Division overall championship, and 3 First Half North Division pennants.

== Return of the Rox ==
In February 2012, the Northwoods League sold the team rights to a local interest group while reserving the rights to the name and logo. The St. Cloud franchise played the 2012 season as the St. Cloud Rox, hearkening back to the minor league team that played in the city from 1946 to 1971.

== Radio broadcasts ==
Rox games can be heard on 1390 Granite City Sports. Aspiring Broadcasters from colleges across the United States have served as the voice of Rox Baseball over the years.

== St. Cloud players in MLB ==
The following is a list of former Rox or River Bats who have played in Major League Baseball.

Name	Year(s) with St. Cloud	MLB accolades
Drew Avans	2017	
Austin Barnes	2010	World Series champion (2x)
Chris Başak	1998/1999	
Buddy Baumann	2007	
Michael Busch	2017	
Mark Canha	2008	
Alex Carrillo	2019	
Riley Cornelio	2021	
Will Craig	2014	
Ben DeLuzio	2016	
Chris Demaria	2000/2001	
Thomas Diamond	2002/2003	
Cam Eden	2017	
Steve Edlefsen	2004	
Jay Flaa	2013	
TJ Friedl	2016	
Mitch Garver	2010/2011	World Series Champion, Silver Slugger
John Gaub	2004	
Lucas Gilbreath	2015	
Tom Gorzelanny	2001	
Justin Huisman	1998/1999	
Chris Jakubauskas	1999	
Jason Jaramillo	2002	
Sean Kazmar	2003	
Otto Kemp	2021	
Roger Kieschnick	2006	
Brice Matthews	2021/2022	
Alex McRae	2013	
Ben Meyer	2012	
Casey McGehee	2001	NL Rookie of the Month (Sep. 2009)
Andrew Pinckney	2021	
Zach Pop	2015	
Robb Quinlan	1998	AL Rookie of the Month (Jul. 2004)
Tony Renda	2009	
Konrad Schmidt	2003/2005	
Daniel Schneemann	2017	
Bob Seymour	2018	
Jake Smith	2011	
Josh Smith	2010	
Jared Solomon	2017	
Dan Straily	2009	
Josh Taylor	2014	
Will Warren	2018	
Robbie Weinhardt	2007	
Jason Wheeler	2010	
Jack Winkler	2020/2021	
