= Jared Solomon =

Jared Solomon may refer to:

- Jared Solomon (baseball)
- Jared Solomon (Maryland politician)
- Jared Solomon (Pennsylvania politician)
- Jared Solomon (music producer)
