= Daulton Varsho =

American baseball player (born 1996)

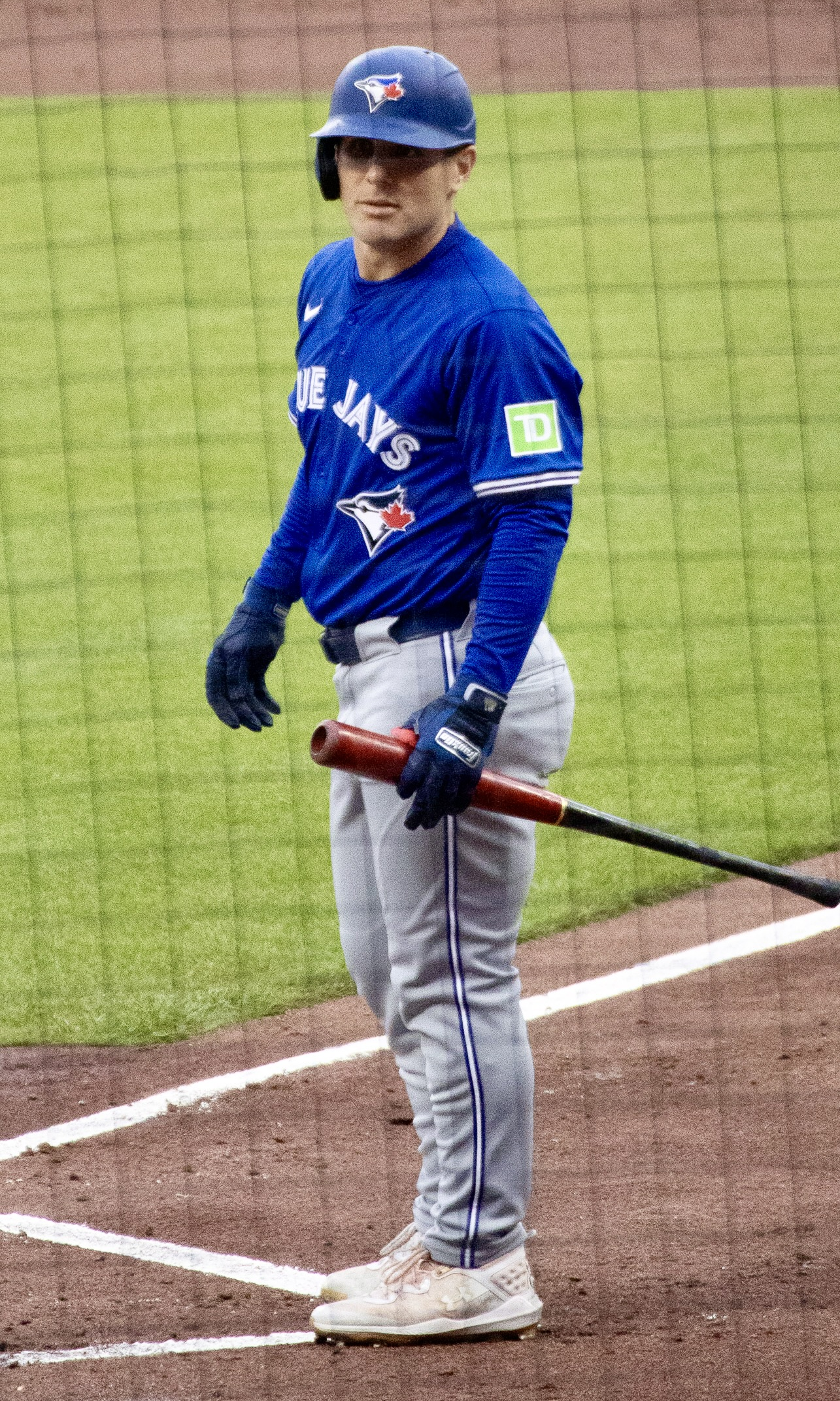
- Varsho with the Toronto Blue Jays in July 2024

Free agent
- Outfielder
- Born: July 2, 1996 (age 30); Marshfield, Wisconsin, U.S.
- Bats: Left Throws: Right

MLB debut
- July 30, 2020, for the Arizona Diamondbacks

MLB statistics (through 2026 season)
- Batting average: .226
- Home runs: 111
- Runs batted in: 335
- Stats at Baseball Reference

Teams
- Arizona Diamondbacks (2020–2022); Toronto Blue Jays (2023–2026); Houston Astros (2026)

Career highlights and awards
- Gold Glove Award (2024)

Daulton John Varsho (born July 2, 1996) is an American professional baseball outfielder who is a free agent. He has played in Major League Baseball (MLB) for the Arizona Diamondbacks, Toronto Blue Jays, and Houston Astros.

== Amateur career ==
Varsho attended Marshfield High School in Marshfield, Wisconsin, graduating in 2014. He enrolled at University of Wisconsin–Milwaukee, and played college baseball for the Milwaukee Panthers. He was named the Horizon League Player of the Year in his sophomore year, 2016, after he batted .381/.447/.610. In 2017 he batted .362/.490/.643.

In both 2015 and 2016, Varsho played summer league baseball for the Eau Claire Express of the Northwoods League. His manager with the Express was his uncle, Dale Varsho.

== Professional career ==
=== Arizona Diamondbacks ===
The Arizona Diamondbacks selected Varsho in the second round, with the 68th overall selection, of the 2017 Major League Baseball (MLB) draft. He signed and made his professional debut that same year with the Hillsboro Hops of the Low–A Northwest League, where he batted .311/.368/.534 with seven home runs, 39 runs batted in (RBI), and had a .902 on-base plus slugging in 50 games.

In 2018, Varsho played with the Visalia Rawhide of the High–A California League, where he hit .286/.363/.451 with 11 home runs, 44 RBI, and 19 stolen bases in 80 games. He was a mid-season All Star.

Varsho spent the 2019 season with the Jackson Generals of the Double–A Southern League. In June, he was named to the 2019 All-Star Futures Game. In August, the Diamondbacks began to play Varsho as a center fielder in addition to catcher. He batted .301/.378/.520 with 18 home runs, 58 RBI, and 21 stolen bases in 396 at–bats. After the season, on October 10, 2019, he was selected for the United States national baseball team in the 2019 WBSC Premier12.

The Diamondbacks promoted Varsho to the major leagues for the first time on July 30, 2020. He made his major league debut that night against the Los Angeles Dodgers. He finished the season hitting .188/.287/.366 with three home runs and nine RBI in 37 games. On August 14, 2021, Varsho caught Tyler Gilbert's no-hitter against the San Diego Padres.

In 2022 he led the majors in percentage of balls pulled (54.5%), and batted .235/.302/.443 with 27 home runs and 74 RBI. He played 71 games in right field, 54 in center field, 31 at catcher, and 15 at DH.

=== Toronto Blue Jays ===
On December 23, 2022, the Diamondbacks traded Varsho to the Toronto Blue Jays in exchange for Lourdes Gurriel Jr. and Gabriel Moreno. On January 13, 2023, Varsho signed a one-year, $3.05 million contract with the Blue Jays, avoiding salary arbitration. In 2023, he batted .229/.298/.416 with 20 home runs, 61 RBI, and 16 stolen bases, and led the AL in bunt hits with 11.

Varsho played in 136 contests for the Blue Jays in 2024, slashing .214/.293/.407 with 18 home runs, 58 RBI, and 10 stolen bases. On September 17, 2024, it was announced that Varsho would be undergoing surgery to repair a rotator cuff injury in his right shoulder, ending his season.

Varsho played in 71 contests for the Blue Jays in 2025, slashing .238/.284/.548 with 20 home runs, 55 RBI, and 2 stolen bases. In Game 2 of the 2025 American League Division Series, Varsho hit two home runs, two doubles, and scored four RBI in a 13-7 Blue Jays victory over the New York Yankees.

On January 8, 2026, Varsho and the Blue Jays avoided arbitration with a $10.75 million contract for the 2026 season. On May 13, Varsho hit the fifth walk-off grand slam in Blue Jays history, for a 5-3 victory over the Tampa Bay Rays in 10 innings.

=== Houston Astros ===
On August 3, 2026, the Blue Jays traded Varsho to the Houston Astros in exchange for Spencer Arrighetti. In 41 contests as a member of the Astros, he hit .172/.224/.311/.535, 5 home runs and 14 RBI. On September 30, 2026, he underwent arthroscopic surgery to remove cysts from the left wrist.

== Personal life ==
He is the son of former MLB outfielder, manager, and coach Gary Varsho, and is named after Darren Daulton, his father's teammate on the Phillies in 1995.
