= Thunder Bay Border Cats =

- Logo

Information
- League: Northwoods League
- Location: Thunder Bay, Ontario
- Ballpark: Port Arthur Stadium
- Founded: 2003
- League championships: 2 (2005, 2008)
- Division championships: 3 (2005, 2006, 2008)
- Colors: Red, black, white
- Mascot: Boomer
- Manager: Joe Ellison

The Thunder Bay Border Cats are a baseball team that plays in the Northwoods League, a collegiate summer baseball league. The league's only Canadian team, their home games are played at Port Arthur Stadium in Thunder Bay, Ontario.

The Border Cats have been Northwoods League champions twice, defeating the Madison Mallards two games to one in both 2005 and 2008. They also were in the Northwoods League championship in 2006, but lost to the Rochester Honkers.

As of 2026, the Border Cats have sent 15 players to the major leagues. Matt Mangini was the first to make the jump, playing 11 games for the Seattle Mariners in 2011. Shortstop Jonathan Diaz followed two years later, playing four games with the Boston Red Sox in 2013. Diaz also spent time with the Toronto Blue Jays in 2014, almost making the team out of spring training. Pitcher Blaine Hardy became a regular in the Detroit Tigers bullpen in 2014. Seth Frankoff pitched in one game for the Chicago Cubs, while A.J. Schugel spent time with the Pittsburgh Pirates and Wes Parsons pitched a relief role.

The Border Cats sat out the 2020, 2021 and 2022 seasons due to "the ongoing uncertainty of the pandemic regarding the Canada-US border closure as well as outdoor gathering numbers". A travel team known as the Minnesota Mud Puppies, based in the Twin Cities region, played the Border Cats' originally scheduled 36 road games during the 2021 season. The Border Cats ultimately returned for the 2023 season.

== 2009 All-Star Game ==
The 2009 Northwoods League All-Star Game was held on July 21 in Thunder Bay. This was the first time the All-Star game played in Canada. The guest speaker for the event was Ferguson Jenkins, a Canadian member of the Baseball Hall of Fame. The game was won 4-2 by the South Division squad, led by the MVP performance of Kurtis Muller, who went 3-for-5.

== Notable active alumni & those reaching Majors ==
Name	Position	Teams	Status	MLB Years
Jonathan Diaz	INF	Boston Red Sox, Toronto Blue Jays	Retired	2013-2015
Matt Mangini	INF	Seattle Mariners	Not active	2010
A.J. Schugel	RHP	Pittsburgh Pirates	Retired	2015-2017
Ryan Court	3B	Seattle Mariners	Retired	2019
Blaine Hardy	RHP	Detroit Tigers, Milwaukee Brewers	Retired	2014-2021
Jason Vosler	SS	San Francisco Giants, Cincinnati Reds, Seattle Mariners	Active (AAA)	2021-2024
Michael Papierski	C	Seattle Mariners	Active (AAA)	2022
Greg Weissert	RP	New York Yankees, Boston Red Sox	Active (AAA)	2022-2024
Wes Parsons	RHP	Atlanta Braves, Colorado Rockies, Toronto Blue Jays, Cleveland Guardians	Active (Released)	2018-2024
Seth Frankoff	RHP	Chicago Cubs, Seattle Mariners, Arizona Diamondbacks	Retired	2017-2021
Jacob Robson	OF	Detroit Tigers	Retired	2021
Matthew Batten	2B	San Diego Padres	Active (AAA)	2022-2024
Penn Murfee	RP	Seattle Mariners, Chicago White Sox	Active (AAA)	2022-2023
Brandon Williamson	SP	Cincinnati Reds	Active (IL)	2023-2024
Billy Cook	1B	Pittsburgh Pirates	Active	2024-2025
Andy Weber	SS	Amarillo (AA)	Active	N/A

Reached Majors

== Year-by-year records ==
Year	League	Division	W	L	W%	Manager	Playoffs
2003	Northwoods League	North	31	33	.484	Mitch Dunn	Did not qualify
2004	Northwoods League	North	32	32	.500	Mitch Dunn	Did not qualify
2005	Northwoods League	North	44	24	.647	Chad Miller	Won championship
2006	Northwoods League	North	29	38	.433	John Herrera	Lost final
2007	Northwoods League	North	28	40	.412	Jared Manske	Did not qualify
2008	Northwoods League	North	42	26	.618	Devin McIntosh	Won championship
2009	Northwoods League	North	27	41	.397	Joel Barta	Did not qualify
2010	Northwoods League	North	31	38	.449	Mike Steed	Did not qualify
2011	Northwoods League	North	29	40	.420	Mike Steed	Did not qualify
2012	Northwoods League	North	32	37	.449	Andy Judkins	Did not qualify
2013	Northwoods League	North	21	49	.300	Dan Holcomb	Did not qualify
2014	Northwoods League	North	23	49	.319	John Hernandez	Did not qualify
2015	Northwoods League	North	33	38	.465	Danny Benedetti	Did not qualify
2016	Northwoods League	North	21	51	.282	Danny Benedetti	Did not qualify
2017	Northwoods League	North	27	43	.386	Mitch Feller	Did not qualify
2018	Northwoods League	North	22	50	.306	Mitch Feller	Did not qualify
2019	Northwoods League	Great Plains East	24	47	.338	Eric Vasquez	Did not qualify
2023	Northwoods League	Great Plains East	27	41	.397	J.M. Kelly	Did not qualify
2024	Northwoods League	Great Plains East	35	34	.507	J.M. Kelly	Did not qualify
2025	Northwoods League	Great Plains East	40	30	.571	Joe Ellison	Did not qualify
2026	Northwoods League	Great Plains East	27	41	.397	Joe Ellison	Did not qualify
TOTAL	--	--	625	822	.432	--	--
