= John Rave =

American baseball player (born 1997)

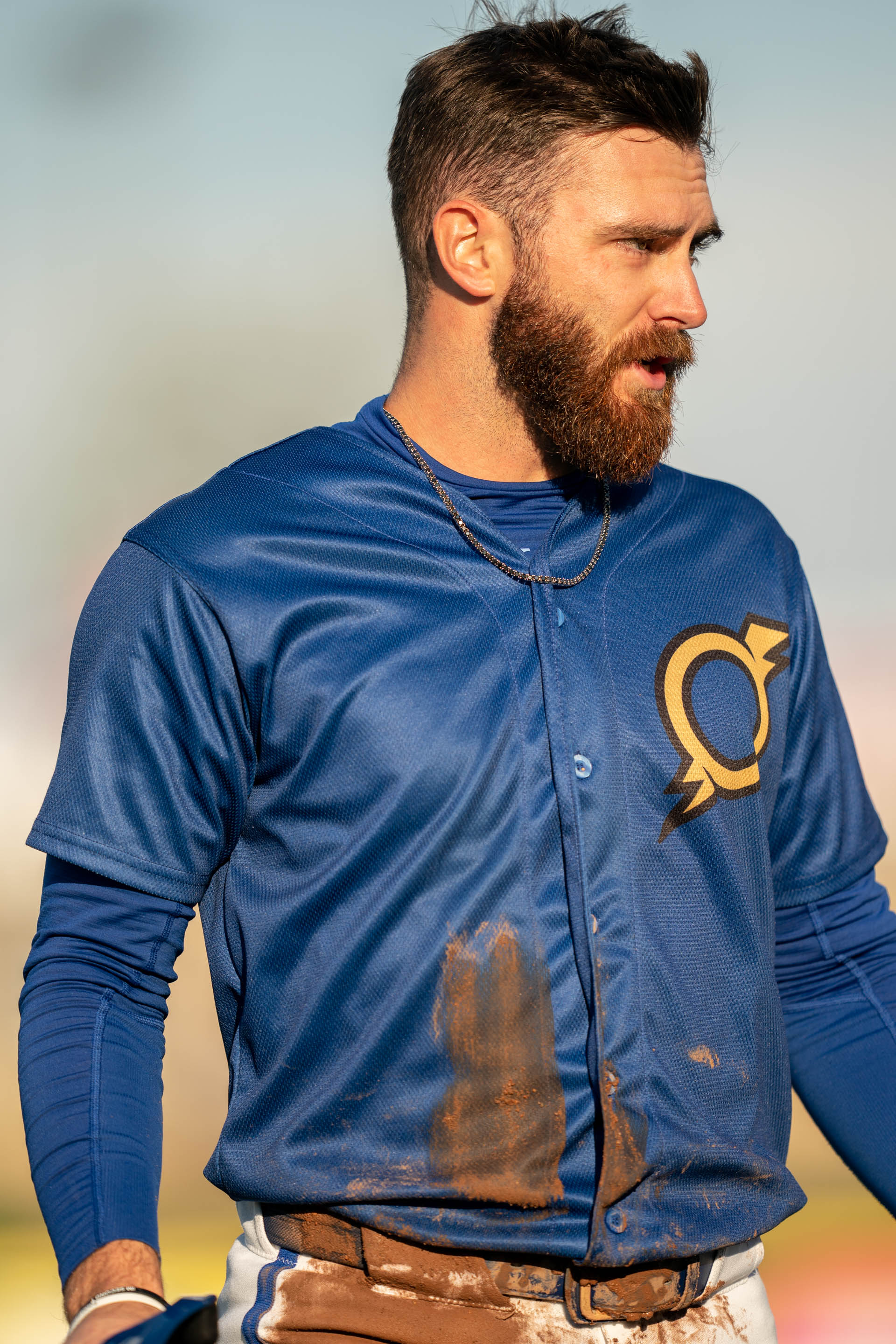
- Rave with the Omaha Storm Chasers in 2025

Kansas City Royals – No. 16
- Outfielder
- Born: December 30, 1997 (age 28); Canton, Illinois, U.S.
- Bats: Left Throws: Left

MLB debut
- May 26, 2025, for the Kansas City Royals

MLB statistics (through 2026 season)
- Batting average: .214
- Home runs: 10
- Runs batted in: 27
- Stats at Baseball Reference

Teams
- Kansas City Royals (2025–present)

John Michael Rave (born December 30, 1997) is an American professional baseball outfielder for the Kansas City Royals of Major League Baseball (MLB). He made his MLB debut in 2025.

== Early life ==
Rave attended Central Catholic High School in Bloomington, Illinois and Illinois State University in Normal, Illinois. In 2018, he played collegiate summer baseball with the Chatham Anglers of the Cape Cod Baseball League and was named a league all-star.

== Career ==
Rave was drafted by the Kansas City Royals in the fifth round, with the 139th overall selection, of the 2019 Major League Baseball draft. He split his first professional season between the rookie-level Burlington Royals and Single-A Lexington Legends, hitting a combined .234 with three home runs, 16 RBI, and nine stolen bases. Rave did not play in a game in 2020 due to the cancellation of the minor league season because of the COVID-19 pandemic.

Rave returned to action in 2021 with the High-A Quad Cities River Bandits, playing in 77 games and batting .252/.352/.453 with 14 home runs, 51 RBI, and 13 stolen bases. He split the 2022 season between the Double-A Northwest Arkansas Naturals and Triple-A Omaha Storm Chasers. In 122 appearances for the two affiliates, Rave slashed a cumulative .256/.353/.412 with 16 home runs, 79 RBI, and 23 stolen bases.

Rave made 124 appearances split between Northwest Arkansas and Omaha during the 2023 campaign, batting .253/.349/.400 with 12 home runs, 62 RBI, and 10 stolen bases. He returned to Omaha in 2024, making 131 appearances and hitting .259/.346/.470 with a career-high 21 home runs, 60 RBI, and 17 stolen bases.

Rave began the 2025 season back with Omaha, and hit .301 with nine home runs, 25 RBI, and 17 stolen bases over his first 44 games. On May 26, 2025, Rave was selected to the 40-man roster and promoted to the major leagues for the first time. On July 18, Rave hit his first two career home runs (off of Sandy Alcántara and Calvin Faucher) in an 8–7, 10–inning loss to the Miami Marlins. Rave made 72 appearances for Kansas City during his rookie campaign, batting .196/.283/.307 with four home runs, 14 RBI, and seven stolen bases.

Rave was optioned to Triple-A Omaha to begin the 2026 season.

== Personal life ==
On February 18, 2020, Rave's father Mike, died of internal bleeding after falling down the stairs at his home. Rave and his wife Amy married in November 2024 in Aurora, Illinois.
