= Drew Avans =

American baseball player (born 1996)

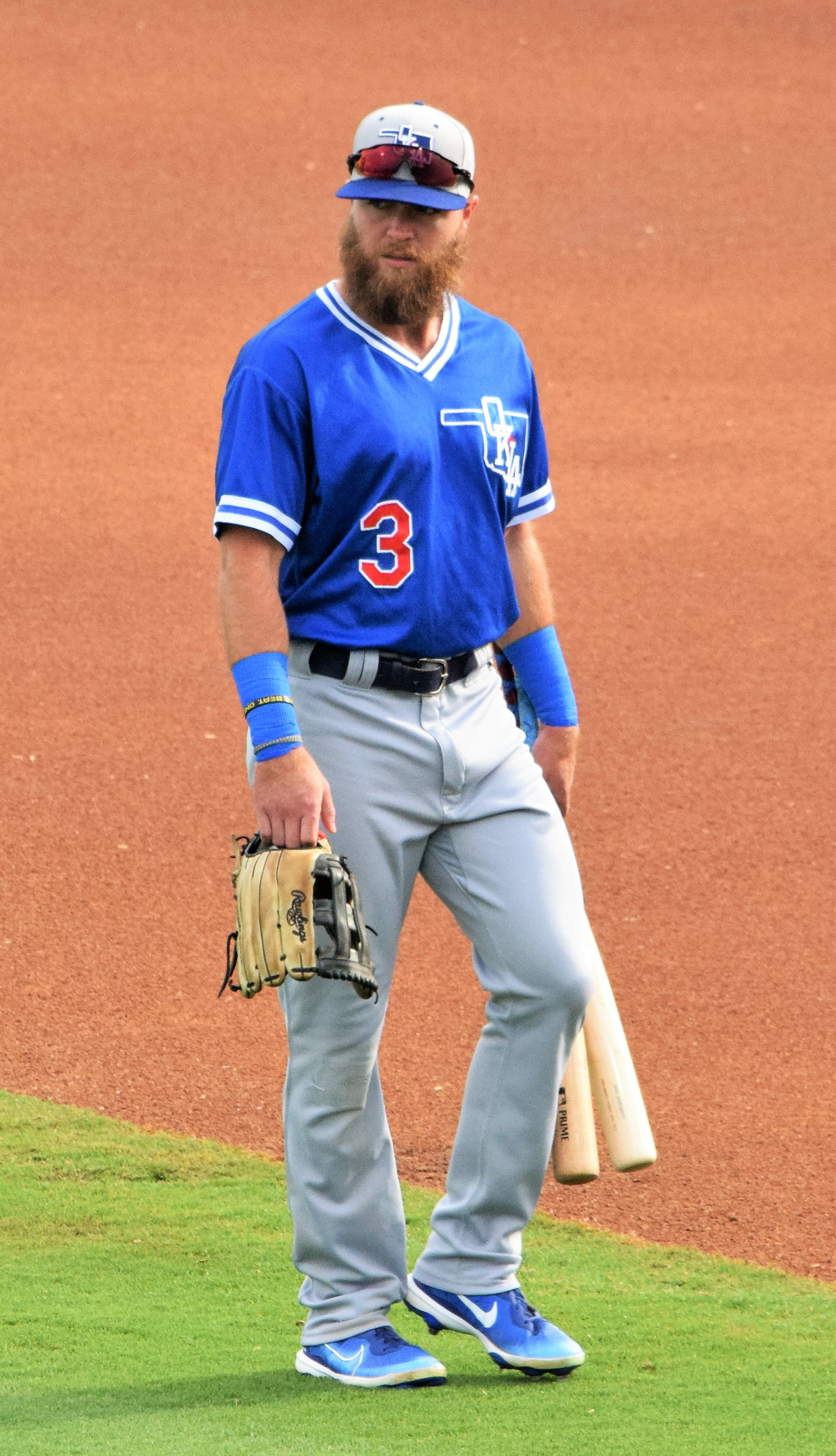
- Avans with the Oklahoma City Dodgers in 2023

Free agent
- Outfielder
- Born: June 13, 1996 (age 30); Alabaster, Alabama, U.S.
- Bats: Left Throws: Left

MLB debut
- May 27, 2025, for the Athletics

MLB statistics (through 2025 season)
- Batting average: .118
- Home runs: 0
- Runs batted in: 1
- Stats at Baseball Reference

Teams
- Athletics (2025); Milwaukee Brewers (2025)

Drew Avans (born June 13, 1996) is an American professional baseball outfielder who is a free agent. He has previously played in Major League Baseball (MLB) for the Athletics and Milwaukee Brewers.

== Career ==
=== Los Angeles Dodgers ===
Avans was drafted by the Los Angeles Dodgers in the 33rd round, with the 1,004th selection, of the 2018 Major League Baseball draft out of Southeastern Louisiana University. He began his career with the rookie–level Arizona League Dodgers before promotions to the rookie–level Ogden Raptors and Single–A Great Lakes Loons, hitting .284 in a combined 60 games. In 2019, Avans played with Great Lakes, the High–A Rancho Cucamonga Quakes and Double–A Tulsa Drillers, hitting .280 in 112 total appearances. He did not play in a game in 2020 due to the cancellation of the minor league season because of the COVID-19 pandemic.

Avans returned to action in 2021 with the Triple–A Oklahoma City Dodgers, and hit .275 with five home runs, 32 RBI, and 19 stolen bases over 90 games. Avans batted .282 in 119 games in 2022 and .254 in 129 games with 11 homers and 58 RBI in 2023 for Oklahoma City. He returned to Oklahoma City for the fourth straight season in 2024, playing in 133 games with a .272 batting average with eight homers, 52 RBI and 35 stolen bases. He also broke the Oklahoma City, Bricktown era, career hits record. Avans elected free agency following the season on November 4, 2024.

=== Oakland Athletics / Athletics ===
On November 20, 2024, Avans signed a minor league contract with the Oakland Athletics. On May 27, 2025, Avans was selected to the 40-man roster and promoted to the major leagues for the first time. He made his MLB debut as a defensive replacement in right field in the seventh inning that night and singled in his first plate appearance against Forrest Whitley of the Houston Astros. In seven appearances for the Athletics, Avans went 2-for-15 (.133). He was designated for assignment by the team on June 6.

=== Milwaukee Brewers ===
On June 8, 2025, Avans was claimed off waivers by the Milwaukee Brewers. In his Brewers debut, on June 15, he went 0-for-2 with a sac fly RBI, his first in the major leagues. Avans was designated for assignment by Milwaukee on July 13. He cleared waivers and was sent outright to the Triple-A Nashville Sounds on July 17. Avans elected free agency following the season on November 6.

=== Colorado Rockies ===
On November 14, 2025, Avans signed a minor league contract with the Colorado Rockies. In 113 games with Triple-A Albuquerque Isotopes he batted .221/.332/.296 with 3 home runs, 49 RBIs and 31 stolen bases. He elected free agency on November 2.
