= Waterloo Bucks =

Amateur baseball team in Waterloo, IA

Logo	Cap insignia

Information
- League: Northwoods League (Great Plains East 2019–pres) (North Division 2010–2018) (South Division 1995–2009))
- Location: Waterloo, Iowa, United States
- Ballpark: Riverfront Stadium
- Founded: 1995
- Division championships: 1996; 1997; 2000; 2002; 2020
- League championships: 1996; 2002
- Colors: Blue, yellow, black, white, tan, beige
- Ownership: Cedar Rapids Ball Club
- Management: Dan Corbin (GM)
- Manager: Darrell Handlesman
- Media: Waterloo-Cedar Falls Courier
- Website: waterloobucks.com

The Waterloo Bucks is a baseball team in Waterloo, Iowa. It is a member of the Northwoods League, a collegiate summer baseball league. Their home games are played at the Riverfront Stadium in Waterloo, Iowa. The team was founded in 1995, making them one of the longest continually operating teams in the league.

== History ==
Riverfront Stadium, built in 1946, had previously hosted Midwest League teams such as the Waterloo Hawks and the Waterloo Diamonds, who had played there as recently as 1993.

After the departure of the Diamonds, the nascent Northwoods League added the Bucks as the league's first expansion team, going from 5 teams in 1994 to 6 in 1995. In the Bucks' first season, they set a league attendance record of 28,745 fans. In their second season, 1996, the Bucks hosted the league All-Star game and also defeated the Rochester Honkers to claim their first Northwoods League title. In 2002, the Bucks defeated the Brainerd Mighty Gulls and claimed their second league title.

On September 29, 2014, The Cedar Rapids Ball Club, Inc. announced that it had officially purchased and taken over operations of the team. The Cedar Rapids Ball Club, Inc. is also the owner of Cedar Rapids Kernels.

In 2020, six Northwoods League teams cancelled their season due to the COVID-19 pandemic. For those teams that did play, instead of playing within their usual divisions, they played in hub regions, with some creating temporary teams. The Bucks played within a 5-team Minnesota-Iowa pod, and finished the season with the best record of the five, capturing the Minnesota-Iowa Region Championship.

== Waterloo Bucks in MLB ==
The following is a list of former Bucks who have played in Major League Baseball.

Name	Year(s) with Bucks	MLB accolades
Dakota Bacus	2011	
Brandon Bantz	2007	
Clint Barmes	1999/2000	NL Rookie of the Month (2005)
Jonah Bride	2015	
Willie Collazo	1999	
Duncan Davitt	2020/2021	
Jeff Duncan	1998	
Dane Dunning	2014	World Series Champion (2023)
Ryan Goins	2008	
Dan Jennings	2006/2007	
James Jones	2008	
Jimmy Journell	1997/1999	
Kevin Kaczmarski	2012/2014	
Jason Krizan	2009	
Kyle Leahy	2016/2017	
Brycen Mautz	2021	
Zach McKinstry	2015	American League All-Star (2025), Silver Slugger (2025)
Wes Obermueller	1996	
Cameron Perkins	2011	
A.J. Puk	2014	
Evan Reed	2005	
Cody Sedlock	2014	
Eric Stout	2013	
Curtis Thigpen	2002	
