= Mickey McDonald =

American baseball player (born 1995)

- Outfielder
- Born: June 2, 1995 (age 31); San Mateo, California, U.S.
- Batted: Left Threw: Right

MLB debut
- April 20, 2022, for the Oakland Athletics

Last MLB appearance
- April 27, 2022, for the Oakland Athletics

MLB statistics
- Batting average: .000
- Home runs: 0
- Runs batted in: 0
- Stats at Baseball Reference

Teams
- Oakland Athletics (2022)

Raymond Mickey McDonald (born June 2, 1995) is an American former professional baseball outfielder. He played in Major League Baseball (MLB) for the Oakland Athletics in 2022.

== Early life ==
Raymond Mickey McDonald was born on June 2, 1995, in San Mateo, California. He attended Junípero Serra High School in San Mateo, California, where he excelled in baseball.

== College career ==
McDonald attended the University of Illinois Chicago and played college baseball for the UIC Flames.

== Professional career ==
=== Minor leagues ===
McDonald was drafted by the Oakland Athletics in the 18th round, with the 531st overall selection, of the 2017 Major League Baseball draft. He played in 36 games during his first professional season, splitting time between the Arizona League Athletics and the Low-A Vermont Lake Monsters. In 2018, McDonald spent the year with the Single-A Beloit Snappers, slashing .284/.356/.353 with 2 home runs and 25 RBI in 110 games for the team. He appeared in 110 games again in 2019, splitting the season between the High-A Stockton Ports and the Double-A Midland RockHounds and hitting .235/.318/.289. McDonald did not play in a game in 2020 due to the cancellation of the minor league season because of the COVID-19 pandemic. McDonald spent the 2021 campaign split between Midland and the Triple-A Las Vegas Aviators, posting a .305/.402/.390 slash with 2 home runs and a career-high 38 RBI in 106 games between the two teams. He was assigned to Triple-A Las Vegas to begin the 2022 season.

=== Major leagues ===
On April 20, 2022, McDonald was selected to the 40-man roster and promoted to the major leagues for the first time. He made his MLB debut that day at Oakland Coliseum, appearing as a pinch hitter in the ninth inning against the Baltimore Orioles. McDonald appeared in four major league games, going 0-for-4 with 2 walks and 3 strikeouts before he was optioned back to Triple-A on April 29. He was designated for assignment the next day following the waiver claim of Domingo Tapia. McDonald cleared waivers and was sent outright to Triple-A Las Vegas on May 2. He played in 83 total games split between Midland and Las Vegas in 2022, batting .279/.381/.368 with three home runs, 23 RBI, and 11 stolen bases. McDonald was released by the Athletics organization on April 21, 2023.
