= La Crosse Loggers =

Minor-league professional baseball team in La Crosse, Wisconsin

- Logo

Information
- League: Northwoods League (Great Plains East 2019-present (North Division 2016-2018) (South Division 2003-2015)
- Location: La Crosse, Wisconsin
- Ballpark: The Lumberyard at Copeland Park
- Founded: 2003
- Division championships: 3 (2009, 2012, 2024)
- League championships: 1 (2012)
- Division championships: 3 (2009, 2012, 2024)
- Colors: Green, black, and white
- Ownership: Dan Kapanke
- Management: Ben Kapanke (GM) Chris Goodell (Team President)
- Manager: Justin Ramsey
- Media: La Crosse Tribune; KQEG Eagle 102.7
- Website: lacrosseloggers.com

The La Crosse Loggers are a La Crosse, Wisconsin based baseball team playing in the Northwoods League, a collegiate summer baseball league. Since the team's inaugural season in 2003, they have played at Copeland Park. The ballpark is nicknamed "the Lumberyard."

The team is owned by Dan Kapanke, a former Wisconsin state senator.

The Loggers are one of 26 teams in the Northwoods League, playing 72 games per season, from late May through mid-August. The Northwoods League is a summer collegiate league that provides an opportunity for college players to spend their summers and display their talents to professional scouts. Players must be enrolled in college and have at least one year of athletic eligibility to participate. The league is designed to give college players the minor league experience, providing players an opportunity to play under the same conditions using wooden bats and minor league specification baseballs, experiencing overnight road trips, and playing nightly before fans in a stadium.

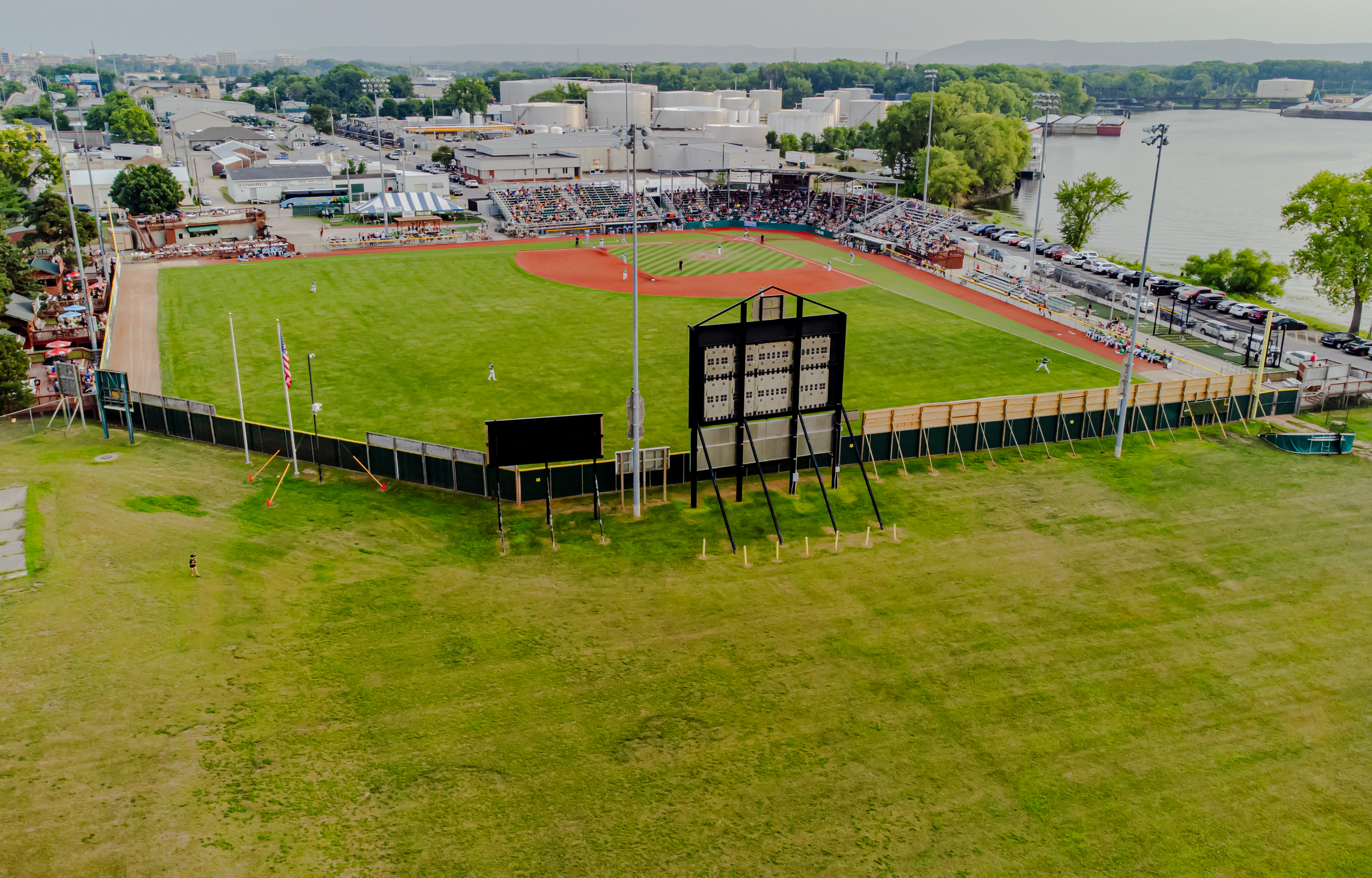
La Crosse Loggers Copeland Park

== Alumni in MLB ==
The following is a list of former La Crosse Loggers who have appeared in Major League Baseball. MLB award winners in bold.

Name	Year(s) with Loggers	MLB accolades
Riley Adams	2015	
Scott Alexander	2008	
Vic Black	2007	
Rob Brantly	2009	
Trevor Brown	2011	
Matt Chapman	2012	All-Star, Gold Glove (5x)
Griffin Conine	2016	
Daniel Herrera	2005	
Brett Jackson	2007	
Brian Keller	2014	
Andrew Knapp	2011	
Taylor Kohlwey	2014	
Kevin Kramer	2012	
Brooks Kriske	2013	
Korey Lee	2017-18	World Series Champion
Mike Marjama	2010	
Mason McCoy	2015-16	
Andrew McKirahan	2009	
Seth Mejias-Brean	2010	
Kyle Nelson	2015	
Lars Nootbaar	2016	
Jordan Pacheco	2005	
Graham Pauley	2020	
Tim Peterson	2011	
Jack Ralston	2015-16	
Nick Raquet	2016	
Christian Roa	2018	
César Salazar	2016	
Chris Sale	2008	All-Star (10x), Cy Young, Gold Glove, World Series Champion
Max Scherzer	2004	All-Star (8x), Cy Young (3x), World Series Champion (2x)
Tyler Smith	2011	
Eric Thames	2007	
Logan VanWey	2020	
David Villar	2017	
Rowan Wick	2011	
Stevie Wilkerson	2011	
