= 2022 Cleveland Guardians season =

2022 Cleveland Guardians
- American League Central champions
- League: American League
- Division: Central
- Ballpark: Progressive Field
- City: Cleveland, Ohio
- Record: 92–70 (.568)
- Divisional place: 1st
- Owners: Larry Dolan
- President of baseball operations: Chris Antonetti
- General managers: Mike Chernoff
- Managers: Terry Francona
- Television: Bally Sports Great Lakes (Matt Underwood, Rick Manning)
- Radio: WTAM · WMMS; Cleveland Guardians Radio Network (Tom Hamilton, Jim Rosenhaus)

The 2022 Cleveland Guardians season was the 122nd season for the franchise. This was the team's first season as the Cleveland Guardians, following the franchise's name change in light of the Cleveland Indians name and logo controversy. The team opened their regular season on April 7, 2022, on the road against the Kansas City Royals, and finished the season on October 5 at home, also against the Royals.

On December 2, 2021, Commissioner of Baseball Rob Manfred announced a lockout of players, following expiration of the collective bargaining agreement (CBA) between the league and the Major League Baseball Players Association (MLBPA). On March 10, 2022, MLB and the MLBPA agreed to a new collective bargaining agreement, ending the lockout. Opening Day was played on April 7. Although MLB previously announced that several series would be cancelled due to the lockout, the agreement provides for a 162-game season, with originally canceled games to be made up via doubleheaders.

The Guardians won the American League Central title for the first time since 2018 and defeated the Tampa Bay Rays in the American League Wild Card Series in a two-game sweep, but were defeated by the New York Yankees in the American League Division Series in five games.

== Offseason ==
=== Lockout ===
The expiration of the league's collective bargaining agreement (CBA) with the Major League Baseball Players Association occurred on December 1, 2021, with no new agreement in place. As a result, the team owners voted unanimously to lockout the players stopping all free agency and trades.

The parties came to an agreement on a new CBA on March 10, 2022.

=== Rule changes ===
Pursuant to the new CBA, several new rules were instituted for the 2022 season. The National League will adopt the designated hitter full-time, a draft lottery will be implemented, the postseason will expand from ten teams to twelve, and advertising patches will appear on player uniforms and helmets for the first time.

== Roster ==
2022 Cleveland Guardians
Roster
Pitchers: 33 Logan Allen; 57 Shane Bieber; 58 Anthony Castro; 43 Aaron Civale; 48 Emmanuel Clase; 71 Xzavion Curry; 62 Enyel De Los Santos; 70 Hunter Gaddis; 50 Ian Gibaut; 26 Anthony Gose; 31 Sam Hentges; 99 James Karinchak; 59 Kirk McCarty; 24 Triston McKenzie; 49 Eli Morgan; 36 Cody Morris; 45 Konnor Pilkington; 34 Zach Plesac; 47 Cal Quantrill; 54 Yohan Ramírez; 52 Nick Sandlin; 27 Bryan Shaw; 37 Trevor Stephan; 56 Tanner Tully; 46 Alex Young	Catchers: 17 Austin Hedges; 10 Bryan Lavastida; 4 Sandy León; 12 Luke Maile; 44 Bo Naylor; Infielders: 8 Gabriel Arias; 44 Bobby Bradley; 2 Yu Chang; 28 Ernie Clement; 2 Tyler Freeman; 0 Andrés Giménez; 6 Owen Miller; 22 Josh Naylor; 11 José Ramírez; 1 Amed Rosario	Outfielders: 29 Will Benson; 63 Will Brennan; 65 Alex Call; 39 Oscar Gonzalez; 33 Nolan Jones; 38 Steven Kwan; 35 Oscar Mercado; 9 Richie Palacios; 32 Franmil Reyes; 7 Myles Straw	Manager: 77 Terry Francona; Coaches: 15 Sandy Alomar Jr. (first base); 87 Mike Barnett (replay coordinator); 64 Armando Camacaro (bullpen catcher/staff assistant); 30 DeMarlo Hale (bench); 84 Kyle Hudson (assistant coach); 82 Ricky Pacione (bullpen catcher/staff assistant); 60 Vic Rodriguez (assistant hitting); 16 Mike Sarbaugh (third base); 85 Brian Sweeney (bullpen); 96 Justin Toole (hitting analyst); 86 Joe Torres (assistant pitching); 13 Chris Valaika (hitting); 51 Carl Willis (pitching)

== Summary ==
The Guardians signed third baseman José Ramírez to a 5-year, $124 million extension with the Cleveland Guardians. Combined with his contract extension signed in November 2021, Ramírez' new contract guaranteed nearly $150 million through 2028. The largest contract awarded in franchise history, the deal also included a full "no-trade" clause.

In Cleveland's home opener, Ramírez doubled in the ninth inning of a 4–1 defeat to the San Francisco Giants for his 1,000th career hit.

Ramírez won American League (AL) Player of the Month honors for April, having hit .342 (27-for-79) and .722 slugging percentage, 12 runs scored, seven doubles, a triple, seven home runs, 28 RBI, and nine bases on balls over 21 games. During that month, he also reached the career milestone of 1,000 games played.

On May 26, the Guardians recalled outfielder Oscar González to the major league roster. He made his major league debut that same day, starting in right field versus the Detroit Tigers at Comerica Park. He singled on a line drive to center field off starting pitcher Tarik Skubal in the top of the second his for the first hit. In the ninth inning, he hit his first major league double.

On May 28 versus Detroit, Ramírez homered, tripled and drove in five runs, amounting to an MLB-leading 48 RBI through the Guardians' first 42 games, tied for third-most in club history. Of all in franchise history, only Manny Ramirez (56 in 1999), Al Rosen (49 in 1954) and Earl Averill (also 48) had equaled or surpassed José Ramírez.

Ramírez was named AL Player of the Week for the May 24–30, having recorded three home runs, three stolen bases, 11 RBI, seven total extra base hits, .348/.423/.957, three walks and one strikeout.

On June 10, versus the Oakland Athletics, González achieved his first major league four-hit game.

The Guardians clinched their 11th AL Central title, and first since 2018, on September 25 after beating the Texas Rangers, 10–4.

The Guardians set a franchise record with four Gold Glove award winners: Shane Bieber, Andrés Giménez, Steven Kwan, and Myles Straw.

Manager Terry Francona was named American League Manager of the Year.

President of Baseball Operations Chris Antonetti won the MLB Executive of the Year Award.

== Season standings ==
=== American League Central ===
AL Central
Team	W	L	Pct.	GB	Home	Road
Cleveland Guardians	92	70	.568	—	46‍–‍35	46‍–‍35
Chicago White Sox	81	81	.500	11	37‍–‍44	44‍–‍37
Minnesota Twins	78	84	.481	14	46‍–‍35	32‍–‍49
Detroit Tigers	66	96	.407	26	36‍–‍46	30‍–‍50
Kansas City Royals	65	97	.401	27	39‍–‍42	26‍–‍55

=== American League Wild Card ===
Division leaders
Team	W	L	Pct.
Houston Astros	106	56	.654
New York Yankees	99	63	.611
Cleveland Guardians	92	70	.568

Wild Card teams (Top 3 teams qualify for postseason)
Team	W	L	Pct.	GB
Toronto Blue Jays	92	70	.568	+6
Seattle Mariners	90	72	.556	+4
Tampa Bay Rays	86	76	.531	—
Baltimore Orioles	83	79	.512	3
Chicago White Sox	81	81	.500	5
Minnesota Twins	78	84	.481	8
Boston Red Sox	78	84	.481	8
Los Angeles Angels	73	89	.451	13
Texas Rangers	68	94	.420	18
Detroit Tigers	66	96	.407	20
Kansas City Royals	65	97	.401	21
Oakland Athletics	60	102	.370	26

=== Record against opponents ===
2022 American League record Source: MLB Standings Grid – 2022
Team	BAL	BOS	CWS	CLE	DET	HOU	KC	LAA	MIN	NYY	OAK	SEA	TB	TEX	TOR	NL
Baltimore	—	9–10	5–2	3–3	1–5	4–3	4–3	6–1	3–4	7–12	3–4	2–4	9–10	6–0	9–10	12–8
Boston	10–9	—	2–4	5–2	5–1	4–2	3–4	4–3	3–4	6–13	5–1	6–1	7–12	6–1	3–16	9–11
Chicago	2–5	4–2	—	7–12	12–7	3–4	9–10	3–4	9–10	3–4	5–2	4–2	4–2	3–4	2–4	11–9
Cleveland	3–3	2–5	12–7	—	10–9	3–4	12–7	3–4	13–6	1–5	6–1	1–6	4–2	5–1	5–2	12–8
Detroit	5–1	1–5	7–12	9–10	—	0–7	10–9	3–3	8–11	1–5	2–5	1–6	2–5	4–3	2–5	11–9
Houston	3–4	2–4	4–3	4–3	7–0	—	5–2	13–6	6–0	5–2	12–7	12–7	5–1	14–5	2–4	12–8
Kansas City	3–4	4–3	10–9	7–12	9–10	2–5	—	3–3	7–12	1–6	3–3	2–4	3–4	2–4	2–5	7–13
Los Angeles	1–6	3–4	4–3	4–3	3–3	6–13	3–3	—	4–2	2–4	12–7	10–9	2–5	9–10	3–4	7–13
Minnesota	4–3	4–3	10–9	6–13	11–8	0–6	12–7	2–4	—	2–5	5–1	4–3	4–2	2–5	4–3	8–12
New York	12–7	13–6	4–3	5–1	5–1	2–5	6–1	4–2	5–2	—	5–2	2–4	11–8	4–3	11–8	10–10
Oakland	4–3	1–5	2–5	1–6	5–2	7–12	3–3	7–12	1–5	2–5	—	8–11	3–4	8–11	3–3	5–15
Seattle	4–2	1–6	2–4	6–1	6–1	7–12	4–2	9–10	3–4	4–2	11–8	—	2–5	14–5	5–2	12–8
Tampa Bay	10–9	12–7	2–4	2–4	5–2	1–5	4–3	5–2	2–4	8–11	4–3	5–2	—	4–3	10–9	12–8
Texas	0–6	1–6	4–3	1–5	3–4	5–14	4–2	10–9	5–2	3–4	11–8	5–14	3–4	—	2–4	11–9
Toronto	10–9	16–3	4–2	2–5	5–2	4–2	5–2	4–3	3–4	8–11	3–3	2–5	9–10	4–2	—	13–7

Updated with the results of all games through October 5, 2022.

== Game log ==
=== Regular season ===
2022 Game Log: 92–70 (Home: 46–35; Away: 46–35)
April: 9–12 (Home: 3–3; Away: 6–9)

#	Date	Opponent	Score	Win	Loss	Save	Attendance	Record	StreakUse background:#fbb for loss, #bfb for win, #bbb for cancelled/postponed -->
1	April 7	@ Royals	1–3	Barlow (1–0)	**McKenzie** (0–1)	—	28,459	0–1	L1
2	April 9	@ Royals	0–1 (10)	Snider (1–0)	**Clase** (0–1)	—	17,103	0–2	L2
3	April 10	@ Royals	17–3	**Quantrill** (1–0)	Bubic (0–1)	—	20,165	1–2	W1
4	April 11	@ Royals	10–7	**Allen** (1–0)	Brentz (0–1)	—	8,971	2–2	W2
5	April 12	@ Reds	10–5	**Stephan** (1–0)	Strickland (0–1)	—	43,036	3–2	W3
6	April 13	@ Reds	7–3	**Morgan** (1–0)	Lodolo (0–1)	—	10,976	4–2	W4
7	April 15	Giants	1–4	Rodón (1-0)	**Plesac** (0-1)	Doval (2)	33,469	4–3	L1
8	April 16	Giants	2–4	Leone (1-0)	**Sandlin** (0-1)	McGee (1)	13,187	4–4	L2
9	April 17	Giants	1–8	Wood (1–0)	**Civale** (0–1)	—	9,620	4–5	L3
—	April 18	White Sox	Postponed (inclement weather); Makeup July 12						
—	April 19	White Sox	Postponed (inclement weather); Makeup April 20						
10	April 20 (1)	White Sox	11–1	**Bieber** (1–0)	Keuchel (1–1)	—	see 2nd game	5–5	W1
11	April 20 (2)	White Sox	2–1	**Gose** (1–0)	Lambert (0–2)	**Clase** (1)	9,196	6–5	W2
12	April 21	White Sox	6–3	**Plesac** (1–1)	Cease (2–1)	**Clase** (2)	8,345	7–5	W3
13	April 22	@ Yankees	1–4	Taillon (1–1)	**Morgan** (1–1)	Chapman (4)	41,062	7–6	L1
14	April 23	@ Yankees	4–5	Castro (1–0)	**Clase** (0–2)	—	39,180	7–7	L2
15	April 24	@ Yankees	2–10	Cole (1–0)	**Civale** (0–2)	—	39,050	7–8	L3
16	April 25	@ Angels	0–3	Lorenzen (2–1)	**Bieber** (1–1)	Iglesias (3)	23,099	7–9	L4
17	April 26	@ Angels	1–4	Sandoval (1–0)	**McKenzie** (0–2)	Iglesias (4)	22,551	7–10	L5
18	April 27	@ Angels	5–9	Ohtani (2–2)	**Plesac** (1–2)	—	28,557	7–11	L6
19	April 28	@ Angels	1–4	Detmers (1–1)	**Quantrill** (1–1)	Iglesias (5)	18,826	7–12	L7
20	April 29	@ Athletics	9–8	**Stephan** (2–0)	Acevedo (0–1)	**Clase** (3)	12,910	8–12	W1
21	April 30	@ Athletics	3–1	**Sandlin** (1–1)	Jiménez (1–1)	**Clase** (4)	6,707	9–12	W2

May: 12–12 (Home: 7–5; Away: 5–7)

#	Date	Opponent	Score	Win	Loss	Save	Attendance	Record	Streak
22	May 1	@ Athletics	7–3	**McKenzie** (1–2)	Kaprielian (0–1)	—	14,945	10–12	W3
—	May 3	Padres	Postponed (inclement weather); Makeup May 4						
23	May 4 (1)	Padres	4–5	Crismatt (1–0)	**Plesac** (1–3)	Rogers (10)	see 2nd game	10–13	L1
24	May 4 (2)	Padres	6–5 (10)	**Sandlin** (2–1)	Lamet (0–1)	—	10,244	11–13	W1
25	May 5	Blue Jays	6–5	**Civale** (1–2)	Berríos (2–1)	**Clase** (5)	9,104	12–13	W2
—	May 6	Blue Jays	Postponed (inclement weather); Makeup May 7						
26	May 7 (1)	Blue Jays	3–8	Gausman (3–1)	**Bieber** (1–2)	—	see 2nd game	12–14	L1
27	May 7 (2)	Blue Jays	8–2	**McKenzie** (2–2)	Stripling (0–1)	—	16,819	13–14	W1
28	May 8	Blue Jays	4–3	**Shaw** (1–0)	Cimber (4–2)	**Clase** (6)	14,787	14–14	W2
29	May 9	@ White Sox	12–9 (11)	**Clase** (1–2)	Burr (0–1)	**Stephan** (1)	17,168	15–14	W3
30	May 10	@ White Sox	1–4	Giolito (2–1)	**Quantrill** (1–2)	Graveman (2)	16,025	15–15	L1
—	May 11	@ White Sox	Postponed (COVID-19); Makeup July 23						
31	May 13	@ Twins	8–12	Jax (3–0)	**Civale** (1–3)	—	18,711	15–16	L2
32	May 14	@ Twins	3–2 (10)	**Sandlin** (3–1)	Cotton (0–1)	**Clase** (7)	22,939	16–16	W1
33	May 15	@ Twins	1–3	Ryan (4–2)	**McKenzie** (2–3)	Pagán (5)	19,850	16–17	L1
34	May 17	Reds	4–5 (10)	Warren (2-1)	**Sandlin** (3-2)	Díaz (1)	12,916	16-18	L2
—	May 18	Reds	Postponed (inclement weather); Makeup May 19						
35	May 19	Reds	2–4	Cessa (2–0)	**Stephan** (2–1)	Santillan (2)	8,510	16–19	L3
36	May 20	Tigers	6–1	**Civale** (2–3)	Barnes (3–1)	—	23,874	17–19	W1
—	May 21	Tigers	Postponed (inclement weather); Makeup July 14						
37	May 22	Tigers	2–4	Faedo (1–1)	**Bieber** (1–3)	Soto (7)	15,554	17–20	L1
38	May 23	@ Astros	6–1	**McKenzie** (3–3)	García (3–3)	—	28,284	18–20	W1
39	May 24	@ Astros	3–7	Valdez (4–2)	**Plesac** (1–4)	—	26,621	18–21	L1
40	May 25	@ Astros	1–2	Javier (3–2)	**Quantrill** (1–3)	Pressly (7)	25,412	18–22	L2
41	May 26	@ Tigers	3–4	Soto (2–2)	**Stephan** (2–2)	—	12,764	18–23	L3
—	May 27	@ Tigers	Postponed (inclement weather); Makeup July 4						
42	May 28	@ Tigers	8–1	**Bieber** (2–3)	Faedo (1–2)	—	26,134	19–23	W1
43	May 29	@ Tigers	1–2	Lange (2–1)	**McKenzie** (3–4)	Soto (8)	19,990	19–24	L1
44	May 30	Royals	7–3	**Sandlin** (4–2)	Snider (3–2)	—	15,271	20–24	W1
45	May 31	Royals	8–3	**Quantrill** (2–3)	Lynch (2–4)	—	10,519	21–24	W2

June: 18–10 (Home: 9–7; Away: 9–3)

#	Date	Opponent	Score	Win	Loss	Save	Attendance	Record	Streak
46	June 1	Royals	4–0	**Pilkington** (1–0)	Keller (1–6)	—	12,895	22–24	W3
47	June 3	@ Orioles	6–3	**Bieber** (3–3)	Zimmermann (2–4)	**Clase** (8)	15,456	23–24	W4
48	June 4	@ Orioles	4–5	Bautista (2–1)	**McKenzie** (3–5)	López (7)	17,183	23–25	L1
49	June 5	@ Orioles	3–2	**Plesac** (2–4)	Kremer (0–1)	**Clase** (9)	14,815	24–25	W1
—	June 6	Rangers	Postponed (inclement weather); Makeup June 7						
50	June 7 (1)	Rangers	6–3	**Quantrill** (3–3)	Gray (1–3)	**Clase** (10)	see 2nd game	25–25	W2
51	June 7 (2)	Rangers	3–6	Hearn (4–4)	**McCarty** (0–1)	Barlow (11)	10,763	25–26	L1
52	June 8	Rangers	4–0	**Morgan** (2–1)	Dunning (1–4)	—	10,965	26–26	W1
53	June 9	Athletics	8–4	**De Los Santos** (1–0)	Trivino (1–5)	—	12,995	27–26	W2
54	June 10	Athletics	3–2	**Gose** (2–0)	Jiménez (2–4)	—	21,311	28–26	W3
55	June 11	Athletics	5–10	Montas (3–6)	**Morgan** (2–2)	—	22,674	28–27	L1
56	June 12	Athletics	6–3	**Quantrill** (4–3)	Irvin (2–3)	**Clase** (11)	17,775	29–27	W1
57	June 14	@ Rockies	4–3 (10)	**Shaw** (2–0)	Stephenson (0–1)	**Clase** (12)	28,377	30–27	W2
58	June 15	@ Rockies	7–5	**Shaw** (3–0)	Gomber (3–7)	**Clase** (13)	23,838	31–27	W3
59	June 16	@ Rockies	4–2	**McKenzie** (4–5)	Kuhl (4–4)	**Clase** (14)	26,629	32–27	W4
60	June 17	@ Dodgers	2–1 (10)	**Gose** (3–0)	Phillips (1–3)	**De Los Santos** (1)	48,361	33–27	W5
61	June 18	@ Dodgers	1–7	Urías (4–6)	**Quantrill** (4–4)	—	50,078	33–28	L1
62	June 19	@ Dodgers	5–3	**Morgan** (3–2)	Kimbrel (0–3)	**Clase** (15)	53,033	34–28	W1
63	June 21	@ Twins	6–5 (11)	**Stephan** (3–2)	Jax (4–1)	**Clase** (16)	22,341	35–28	W2
64	June 22	@ Twins	11–10	**Hentges** (1–0)	Jax (4–2)	**Clase** (17)	25,604	36–28	W3
65	June 23	@ Twins	0–1	Smeltzer (4–1)	**Plesac** (2–5)	Thielbar (1)	24,929	36–29	L1
66	June 24	Red Sox	3–6	Pivetta (8–5)	**Shaw** (3–1)	—	29,106	36–30	L2
67	June 25	Red Sox	2–4	Winckowski (3–1)	**Bieber** (3–4)	Houck (6)	27,239	36–31	L3
68	June 26	Red Sox	3–8	Hill (4–4)	**Civale** (2–4)	—	20,663	36–32	L4
69	June 27	Twins	1–11	Gray (4–1)	**McKenzie** (4–6)	—	12,554	36–33	L5
70	June 28 (1)	Twins	3–2	**Hentges** (2–0)	Pagán (1–3)	**Clase** (18)	12,442	37–33	W1
71	June 28 (2)	Twins	0–6	Winder (3–2)	**Pilkington** (1–1)	—	12,145	37–34	L1
72	June 29	Twins	7–6 (10)	**Morgan** (4–2)	Cotton (2–2)	—	12,840	38–34	W1
73	June 30	Twins	5–3	**Clase** (2–2)	Thornburg (0–1)	—	17,066	39–34	W2

July: 13–15 (Home: 6–4; Away: 7–11)

#	Date	Opponent	Score	Win	Loss	Save	Attendance	Record	Streak
—	July 1	Yankees	Postponed (inclement weather); Makeup July 2						
74	July 2 (1)	Yankees	4–13	Cole (7–2)	**McCarty** (0–2)	—	21,203	39–35	L1
75	July 2 (2)	Yankees	1–6	Cortés Jr. (7–3)	**Civale** (2–5)	Holmes (15)	29,236	39–36	L2
76	July 3	Yankees	2–0	**McKenzie** (5–6)	Montgomery (3–2)	**Clase** (19)	26,113	40–36	W1
77	July 4 (1)	@ Tigers	1–4	Hill (1–0)	**Plesac** (2–6)	Soto (16)	19,737	40–37	L1
78	July 4 (2)	@ Tigers	3–5	Alexander (2–3)	**Stephan** (3–3)	Jiménez (1)	24,395	40–38	L2
79	July 5	@ Tigers	4–11	Hutchison (1–4)	**Quantrill** (4–5)	—	16,662	40–39	L3
80	July 6	@ Tigers	2–8	Pineda (2–3)	**Bieber** (3–5)	—	17,829	40–40	L4
81	July 8	@ Royals	3–4	Barlow (3–2)	**Hentges** (2–1)	—	19,611	40–41	L5
82	July 9	@ Royals	13–1	**McKenzie** (6–6)	Heasley (1–5)	—	17,024	41–41	W1
83	July 10	@ Royals	1–5	Greinke (3–5)	**Plesac** (2–7)	—	13,284	41–42	L1
84	July 11	White Sox	8–4	**Quantrill** (5–5)	Lynn (1–2)	—	13,655	42–42	W1
85	July 12 (1)	White Sox	4–1	**Bieber** (4–5)	Martin (1–3)	—	11,342	43–42	W2
86	July 12 (2)	White Sox	0–7	Cease (8–4)	**Pilkington** (1–2)	—	11,750	43–43	L1
87	July 13	White Sox	1–2	Giolito (6–5)	**Hentges** (2–2)	Hendriks (18)	13,987	43–44	L2
88	July 14	Tigers	4–0	**McKenzie** (7–6)	Rodríguez (0–4)	—	14,327	44–44	W1
89	July 15	Tigers	6–5	**Shaw** (4–1)	Fulmer (2–4)	**Stephan** (2)	27,846	45–44	W2
90	July 16	Tigers	10–0	**Quantrill** (6–5)	Pineda (2–5)	—	26,789	46–44	W3
--	July 17	Tigers	Postponed (inclement weather); Makeup August 15						
**92nd All-Star Game: Los Angeles, CA**
91	July 22	@ White Sox	8–2	**Quantrill** (7–5)	Giolito (6–6)	—	31,379	47–44	W4
92	July 23 (1)	@ White Sox	7–4	**Stephan** (4–3)	Hendriks (1–3)	**Clase** (20)	18,518	48–44	W5
93	July 23 (2)	@ White Sox	4–5	Kelly (1–2)	**Shaw** (4–2)	Foster (1)	26,329	48–45	L1
94	July 24	@ White Sox	3–6	Cease (10–4)	**Bieber** (4–6)	—	30,831	48–46	L2
95	July 25	@ Red Sox	1–3	Schreiber (3–1)	**Plesac** (2–8)	Whitlock (2)	32,529	48–47	L3
96	July 26	@ Red Sox	8–3	**McCarty** (1–2)	Winckowski (3–5)	—	32,483	49–47	W1
97	July 27	@ Red Sox	7–6	**De Los Santos** (2–0)	Houck (5–4)	**Clase** (21)	32,919	50–47	W2
98	July 28	@ Red Sox	2–4	Diekman (5–1)	**McKenzie** (7–7)	Whitlock (3)	32,122	50–48	L1
99	July 29	@ Rays	4–1	**Bieber** (5–6)	Springs (3–3)	**Clase** (22)	14,671	51–48	W1
100	July 30	@ Rays	4–6	Kluber (7–6)	**Plesac** (2–9)	Fairbanks (2)	22,756	51–49	L1
101	July 31	@ Rays	5–3	**McCarty** (2–2)	McClanahan (10–4)	**Clase** (23)	18,023	52–49	W1

August: 16–11 (Home: 8–7; Away: 8–4)

#	Date	Opponent	Score	Win	Loss	Save	Attendance	Record	Streak
102	August 1	Diamondbacks	6–5 (11)	**Hentges** (3–2)	Melancon (3–10)	—	13,707	53–49	W2
103	August 2	Diamondbacks	3–6	Gallen (6–2)	**McKenzie** (7–8)	Kennedy (5)	14,471	53–50	L1
104	August 3	Diamondbacks	7–4	**Bieber** (6–6)	Henry (0–1)	—	18,642	54–50	W1
105	August 4	Astros	0–6	Verlander (15–3)	**Plesac** (2–10)	—	16,808	54–51	L1
106	August 5	Astros	3–9	Valdez (10–4)	**Gaddis** (0–1)	—	24,712	54–52	L2
107	August 6	Astros	4–1	**Quantrill** (8–5)	García (8–8)	—	25,327	55–52	W1
108	August 7	Astros	1–0	**McKenzie** (8–8)	Javier (6–8)	**Clase** (24)	22,688	56–52	W2
109	August 9	@ Tigers	5–2	**Bieber** (7–6)	Alexander (2–6)	**Clase** (25)	16,359	57–52	W3
110	August 10	@ Tigers	3–2	**Shaw** (5–2)	Hutchison (1–6)	**Clase** (26)	16,560	58–52	W4
111	August 11	@ Tigers	4–3 (10)	**De Los Santos** (3–0)	Soto (2–7)	**Shaw** (1)	19,036	59–52	W5
112	August 12	@ Blue Jays	8–0	**Quantrill** (9–5)	Berríos (8–5)	—	41,677	60–52	W6
113	August 13	@ Blue Jays	1–2	Bass (3–3)	**McKenzie** (8–9)	Romano (26)	44,977	60–53	L1
114	August 14	@ Blue Jays	7–2	**Bieber** (8–6)	Gausman (8–9)	—	41,002	61–53	W1
115	August 15 (1)	Tigers	4–1	**Karinchak** (1–0)	Vest (3–3)	**Clase** (27)	see 2nd game	62–53	W2
116	August 15 (2)	Tigers	5–7	Garcia (1–0)	**Morgan** (4–3)	Soto (21)	16,980	62–54	L1
117	August 16	Tigers	3–4	Hill (3–3)	**Plesac** (2–11)	Soto (22)	13,503	62–55	L2
118	August 17	Tigers	8–4	**Shaw** (6–2)	Chafin (0–2)	—	14,335	63–55	W1
119	August 19	White Sox	5-2	**McKenzie** (9-9)	Lopez (5–3)	**Clase** (28)	25,521	64-55	W2
120	August 20	White Sox	0–2	Cueto (6–5)	**Bieber** (8–7)	Hendriks (28)	26,179	64–56	L1
—	August 21	White Sox	Postponed (inclement weather); Makeup September 15						
121	August 23	@ Padres	3–1	**Sandlin** (5–2)	Clevinger (4–5)	**Clase** (29)	38,166	65–56	W1
122	August 24	@ Padres	7–0	**Quantrill** (10–5)	Snell (5–7)	—	30,409	66–56	W2
123	August 25	@ Mariners	1–3	Gonzales (9–12)	**McKenzie** (9–10)	Muñoz (3)	24,028	66–57	L1
124	August 26	@ Mariners	2–3 (11)	Murfee (4–0)	**Clase** (2–3)	—	39,870	66–58	L2
125	August 27	@ Mariners	4–3	**Plesac** (3–11)	Muñoz (2–5)	**Clase** (30)	45,586	67–58	W1
126	August 28	@ Mariners	0–4	Ray (11–8)	**Civale** (2–6)	—	45,190	67–59	L1
127	August 30	Orioles	5–1	**Quantrill** (11–5)	Watkins (4–5)	—	12,492	68–59	W1
128	August 31	Orioles	0–4	Lyles (10–9)	**McKenzie** (9–11)	—	12,221	68–60	L1

September: 21–8 (Home: 10–7; Away: 11–1)

#	Date	Opponent	Score	Win	Loss	Save	Attendance	Record	Streak
129	September 1	Orioles	0–3	Bradish (3–5)	**Bieber** (8–8)	Bautista (11)	11,827	68–61	L2
130	September 2	Mariners	1–6	Castillo (6–5)	**Morris** (0–1)	—	21,923	68–62	L3
131	September 3	Mariners	0–4	Ray (12–8)	**Curry** (0–1)	—	26,254	68–63	L4
132	September 4	Mariners	3–6 (11)	Boyd (1–0)	**Stephan** (4–4)	Flexen (2)	17,809	68–64	L5
133	September 5	@ Royals	6–5 (10)	**Morgan** (5–3)	Hernández (0–5)	**Clase** (31)	11,511	69–64	W1
134	September 6	@ Royals	4–1	**Bieber** (9–8)	Bubic (2–11)	**Karinchak** (1)	12,580	70–64	W2
135	September 7	@ Royals	1–2	Barlow (6–4)	**Clase** (2–4)	—	13,394	70–65	L1
136	September 9	@ Twins	7–6	**Quantrill** (12–5)	Bundy (8–7)	**Clase** (32)	18,595	71–65	W1
137	September 10	@ Twins	6–4	**McKenzie** (10–11)	Archer (2–8)	**Clase** (33)	26,073	72–65	W2
138	September 11	@ Twins	4–1	**Bieber** (10–8)	Winder (4–4)	**Karinchak** (2)	19,016	73–65	W3
139	September 12	Angels	5–4	**De Los Santos** (4–0)	Loup (0–5)	**Clase** (34)	12,461	74–65	W4
140	September 13	Angels	3–1	**McCarty** (3–2)	Suárez (6–7)	**Clase** (35)	14,419	75–65	W5
141	September 14	Angels	5–3	**Stephan** (5–4)	Tepera (4–3)	**Karinchak** (3)	14,529	76–65	W6
142	September 15	White Sox	2–8	Lynn (7–5)	**Gaddis** (0–2)	—	11,186	76–66	L1
143	September 16	Twins	4–3	**Stephan** (6–4)	Durán (2–4)	**Clase** (36)	20,669	77–66	W1
144	September 17 (1)	Twins	5–1	**Bieber** (11−8)	Varland (0−1)	—	18,177	78–66	W2
145	September 17 (2)	Twins	7–6 (15)	**McCarty** (4–2)	Rodríguez (0–1)	—	24,449	79–66	W3
146	September 18	Twins	0–3	Ryan (12–8)	**Morris** (0–2)	Durán (8)	19,601	79–67	L1
147	September 19	Twins	11–4	**Quantrill** (13–5)	Gray (8–5)	**Hentges** (1)	12,168	80–67	W1
148	September 20	@ White Sox	10–7 (11)	**Clase** (3–4)	Diekman (5–4)	—	23,242	81–67	W2
149	September 21	@ White Sox	8–2	**McKenzie** (11–11)	Lynn (7–6)	—	22,606	82–67	W3
150	September 22	@ White Sox	4–2	**Bieber** (12–8)	Cueto (7–9)	**Clase** (37)	23,395	83–67	W4
151	September 23	@ Rangers	6–3	**Morris** (1–2)	Hearn (6–8)	**Clase** (38)	34,862	84–67	W5
152	September 24	@ Rangers	4–2	**Quantrill** (14–5)	Burke (7–4)	**Clase** (39)	28,415	85–67	W6
153	September 25	@ Rangers	10–4	**Civale** (3–6)	Ragans (0–3)	—	31,845	86–67	W7
154	September 27	Rays	5–6 (11)	Guerra (2–0)	**Stephan** (6–5)	Faucher (1)	10,775	86–68	L1
155	September 28	Rays	2–1 (10)	**Karinchak** (2–0)	Guerra (2–1)	—	10,674	87–68	W1
156	September 29	Rays	2–1	**De Los Santos** (5–0)	Armstrong (2–3)	**Stephan** (3)	11,783	88–68	W2
157	September 30	Royals	6–3	**Civale** (4–6)	Singer (10–5)	**Clase** (40)	19,763	89–68	W3

October: 3–2 (Home: 3–2; Away: 0–0)

#	Date	Opponent	Score	Win	Loss	Save	Attendance	Record	Streak
158	October 1	Royals	1–7	Bubic (3–13)	**Plesac** (3–12)	—	26,982	89–69	L1
159	October 2	Royals	7–5	**Bieber** (13–8)	Castillo (0–2)	**Clase** (41)	20,622	90–69	W1
160	October 3	Royals	2–5 (10)	Barlow (7–4)	**McCarty** (4–3)	Clarke (3)	18,688	90–70	L1
161	October 4	Royals	5–3	**Quantrill** (15–5)	Lynch (4–13)	**Clase** (42)	19,455	91–70	W1
162	October 5	Royals	9–2	**Civale** (5–6)	Heasley (4–10)	—	12,983	92–70	W2

Legend: = Win = Loss = Postponement
Bold = Guardians team member

== Postseason ==
=== Game log ===
2022 Postseason: 4−3 (Home 3−1; Away 1−2)
American League Wild Card Series: 2−0 (Home 2–0; Away 0–0)

#	Date	Opponent	Score	Win	Loss	Save	Attendance	Record
1	October 7	Rays	2–1	**Bieber** (1–0)	McClanahan (0–1)	**Clase** (1)	30,741	1–0
2	October 8	Rays	1–0 (15)	**Hentges** (1–0)	Kluber (0–1)	—	34,971	2–0

American League Division Series: 2−3 (Home 1–1; Away 1–2)

#	Date	Opponent	Score	Win	Loss	Save	Attendance	Record
1	October 11	@ Yankees	1−4	Cole (1−0)	**Quantrill** (0−1)	—	47,807	0−1
—	October 13	@ Yankees	Postponed (rain); Makeup October 14					
2	October 14	@ Yankees	4–2 (10)	**Clase** (1–0)	Taillon (0–1)	—	47,535	1–1
3	October 15	Yankees	6–5	**Morgan** (1–0)	Schmidt (0–1)	—	36,483	2–1
4	October 16	Yankees	2–4	Cole (2–0)	**Quantrill** (0–2)	Peralta (1)	36,728	2–2
—	October 17	@ Yankees	Postponed (rain); Makeup October 18					
5	October 18	@ Yankees	1–5	Cortés Jr. (1–0)	**Civale** (0–1)	—	48,178	2–3

Legend: = Win = Loss = Postponement
Bold = Guardians team member

=== Postseason rosters ===
Playoff rosters
American League Wild Card Series

- Pitchers: 24 Triston McKenzie 31 Sam Hentges 34 Zach Plesac 37 Trevor Stephan 47 Cal Quantrill 48 Emmanuel Clase 49 Eli Morgan 52 Nick Sandlin 57 Shane Bieber 59 Kirk McCarty 62 Enyel De Los Santos 99 James Karinchak
- Catchers: 12 Luke Maile 17 Austin Hedges 44 Bo Naylor
- Infielders: 0 Andrés Giménez 1 Amed Rosario 6 Owen Miller 8 Gabriel Arias 11 José Ramírez 22 Josh Naylor
- Outfielders: 7 Myles Straw 29 Will Benson 38 Steven Kwan 39 Oscar González 63 Will Brennan

American League Division Series

- Pitchers: 24 Triston McKenzie 31 Sam Hentges 34 Zach Plesac 36 Cody Morris 37 Trevor Stephan 43 Aaron Civale 47 Cal Quantrill 48 Emmanuel Clase 49 Eli Morgan 57 Shane Bieber 62 Enyel De Los Santos 99 James Karinchak
- Catchers: 12 Luke Maile 17 Austin Hedges 44 Bo Naylor
- Infielders: 0 Andrés Giménez 1 Amed Rosario 6 Owen Miller 8 Gabriel Arias 11 José Ramírez 22 Josh Naylor
- Outfielders: 7 Myles Straw 29 Will Benson 38 Steven Kwan 39 Oscar González 63 Will Brennan

== Player stats ==
Note: Team leaders are indicated in bold.

- Indicates league leader.

=== Batting ===
Note: G = Games played; AB = At bats; R = Runs scored; H = Hits; 2B = Doubles; 3B = Triples; HR = Home runs; RBI = Runs batted in; AVG = Batting average; SB = Stolen bases

Player	G	AB	R	H	2B	3B	HR	RBI	AVG	SB
Gabriel Arias	16	47	9	9	1	1	1	5	.191	1
Will Benson	28	55	8	10	1	0	0	3	.182	0
Bobby Bradley	8	17	1	2	0	0	0	0	.118	0
Will Brennan	11	42	6	15	1	1	1	7	.357	2
Alex Call	12	12	2	2	0	0	0	0	.167	0
Yu Chang	4	10	0	0	0	0	0	0	.000	0
Ernie Clement	63	145	18	29	3	0	0	6	.200	0
Enyel De Los Santos	1	0	0	0	0	0	0	0	—	0
Tyler Freeman	24	77	9	19	3	0	0	3	.247	1
Andrés Giménez	146	491	66	146	26	3	17	69	.297	20
Oscar González	91	362	39	107	27	0	11	43	.296	1
Austin Hedges	105	294	26	48	4	0	7	30	.163	2
Nolan Jones	28	86	10	21	5	0	2	13	.244	0
Steven Kwan	147	563	89	168	25	7	6	52	**.298**	19
Bryan Lavastida	6	12	0	1	0	0	0	0	.083	0
Sandy León	8	15	0	2	0	0	0	0	.133	0
Luke Maile	76	181	19	40	10	0	3	17	.221	0
Oscar Mercado	53	119	17	25	6	1	4	16	.210	2
Owen Miller	130	424	53	103	26	1	6	51	.243	2
Bo Naylor	5	8	0	0	0	0	0	0	.000	0
Josh Naylor	122	449	47	115	28	0	20	79	.256	6
Richie Palacios	54	112	7	26	6	0	0	10	.232	2
José Ramírez	**157**	601	**90**	168	**44***	5	**29**	**126**	.280	20
Franmil Reyes	70	263	24	56	9	0	9	28	.213	2
Amed Rosario	153	**637**	86	**180**	26	**9***	11	71	.283	18
Bryan Shaw	1	0	0	0	0	0	0	0	—	0
Myles Straw	152	535	72	118	22	3	0	32	.221	**21**
**Team totals**	**162**	**5558**	**698**	**1410**	**273**	**31**	**127**	**662**	**.254**	**119**

=== Pitching ===
Note: W = Wins; L = Losses; ERA = Earned run average; G = Games pitched; GS = Games started; SV = Saves; IP = Innings pitched; H = Hits allowed; R = Runs allowed; ER = Earned runs allowed; BB = Walks allowed; K = Strikeouts

Player	W	L	ERA	G	GS	SV	IP	H	R	ER	BB	K
Logan Allen	1	0	4.50	4	0	0	6.0	9	3	3	3	6
Shane Bieber	13	8	**2.88**	31	31	0	**200.0**	172	70	64	36	**198**
Anthony Castro	0	0	7.43	12	0	0	13.1	19	15	11	10	12
Aaron Civale	5	6	4.92	20	20	0	97.0	93	58	53	22	98
Emmanuel Clase	3	4	1.36	**77***	0	**42***	72.2	43	18	11	10	77
Ernie Clement	0	0	18.00	2	0	0	2.0	6	4	4	0	0
Xzavion Curry	0	1	5.79	2	2	0	9.1	13	7	6	6	3
Enyel De Los Santos	5	0	3.04	50	0	1	53.1	40	18	18	17	61
Hunter Gaddis	0	2	18.41	2	2	0	7.1	15	15	15	3	5
Ian Gibaut	0	0	0.00	1	0	0	1.1	1	0	0	0	0
Anthony Gose	3	0	4.71	22	0	0	21.0	15	13	11	14	28
Sam Hentges	3	2	2.32	57	0	1	62.0	41	17	16	19	72
James Karinchak	2	0	2.08	38	0	3	39.0	22	9	9	21	62
Sandy León	0	0	0.00	1	0	0	2.0	0	0	0	0	0
Kirk McCarty	4	3	4.54	13	2	0	37.2	37	23	19	13	26
Triston McKenzie	11	11	2.96	31	30	0	191.1	138	65	63	44	190
Eli Morgan	5	3	3.38	50	1	0	66.2	46	29	25	13	72
Cody Morris	1	2	2.28	7	5	0	23.2	21	8	6	12	23
Konnor Pilkington	1	2	3.88	15	11	0	58.0	53	30	25	32	50
Zach Plesac	3	**12**	4.31	25	24	0	131.2	136	74	63	38	100
Cal Quantrill	**15**	5	3.38	32	**32**	0	186.1	**178**	**78**	**70**	**47**	128
Yohan Ramírez	0	0	4.50	1	0	0	2.0	3	1	1	1	1
Nick Sandlin	5	2	2.25	46	0	0	44.0	27	13	11	24	41
Bryan Shaw	6	2	5.40	60	2	1	58.1	58	38	35	26	52
Trevor Stephan	6	5	2.69	66	0	3	63.2	57	24	19	18	82
Tanner Tully	0	0	6.00	3	0	0	6.0	8	4	4	6	2
Alex Young	0	0	0.00	1	0	0	0.1	1	0	0	0	1
**Team totals**	**92**	**70**	**3.46**	**162**	**162**	**51**	**1456.0**	**1252**	**634**	**560**	**435**	**1390**

== Postseason stats ==
=== Batting ===
Player	G	AB	R	H	2B	3B	HR	RBI	AVG	SB
Gabriel Arias	3	11	1	3	1	0	0	0	.273	0
Will Benson	1	1	0	0	0	0	0	0	.000	0
Will Brennan	5	11	0	2	0	0	0	1	.182	0
Andrés Giménez	7	28	1	5	1	0	0	1	.179	1
Oscar González	7	31	2	7	0	0	1	4	.226	0
Austin Hedges	7	15	1	2	0	0	0	0	.133	0
Steven Kwan	7	30	4	9	1	0	1	2	.300	1
Luke Maile	5	3	0	1	0	0	0	0	.333	0
Owen Miller	5	9	0	1	0	0	0	0	.111	0
Josh Naylor	7	31	2	6	1	0	1	3	.194	0
José Ramírez	7	30	2	10	2	0	1	4	.333	0
Amed Rosario	7	29	3	7	0	0	1	2	.241	1
Myles Straw	7	25	1	4	0	0	0	0	.160	1
Totals	7	254	17	57	6	0	5	17	.224	4

=== Pitching ===
Player	W	L	ERA	G	GS	SV	IP	H	R	ER	BB	K
Shane Bieber	1	0	2.03	2	2	0	13.1	8	3	3	4	15
Aaron Civale	0	1	81.00	1	1	0	0.1	2	3	3	1	1
Emmanuel Clase	1	0	0.00	4	0	1	6.0	1	0	0	2	6
Enyel De Los Santos	0	0	0.00	3	0	0	3.1	2	0	0	1	1
Sam Hentges	1	0	2.84	3	0	0	6.1	5	2	2	2	10
James Karinchak	0	0	0.00	4	0	0	5.0	3	0	0	4	6
Triston McKenzie	0	0	3.27	2	2	0	11.0	6	4	4	3	13
Eli Morgan	1	0	2.70	3	0	0	3.1	2	1	1	0	5
Cody Morris	0	0	0.00	1	0	0	2.0	0	0	0	0	3
Zach Plesac	0	0	0.00	1	0	0	1.0	0	0	0	0	2
Cal Quantrill	0	2	5.40	2	2	0	10.0	8	7	6	4	8
Nick Sandlin	0	0	0.00	1	0	0	0.2	0	0	0	1	1
Trevor Stephan	0	0	1.59	4	0	0	5.2	0	1	1	1	11
Totals	4	3	2.65	7	7	1	68.0	37	21	20	23	82

== Farm system ==
Level	Team	League	Manager
AAA	Columbus Clippers	International League	Andy Tracy
AA	Akron RubberDucks	Eastern League	Rouglas Odor
High-A	Lake County Captains	Midwest League	Greg DiCenzo
Low–A	Lynchburg Hillcats	Carolina League	Omir Santos
Rookie	ACL Guardians	Arizona Complex League	Jordan R. Smith
Rookie	DSL Guardians Blue	Dominican Summer League	Jesús Tavárez
Rookie	DSL Guardians Red	Dominican Summer League	Carlos Fermin
