= Richie Palacios =

American baseball player (born 1997)

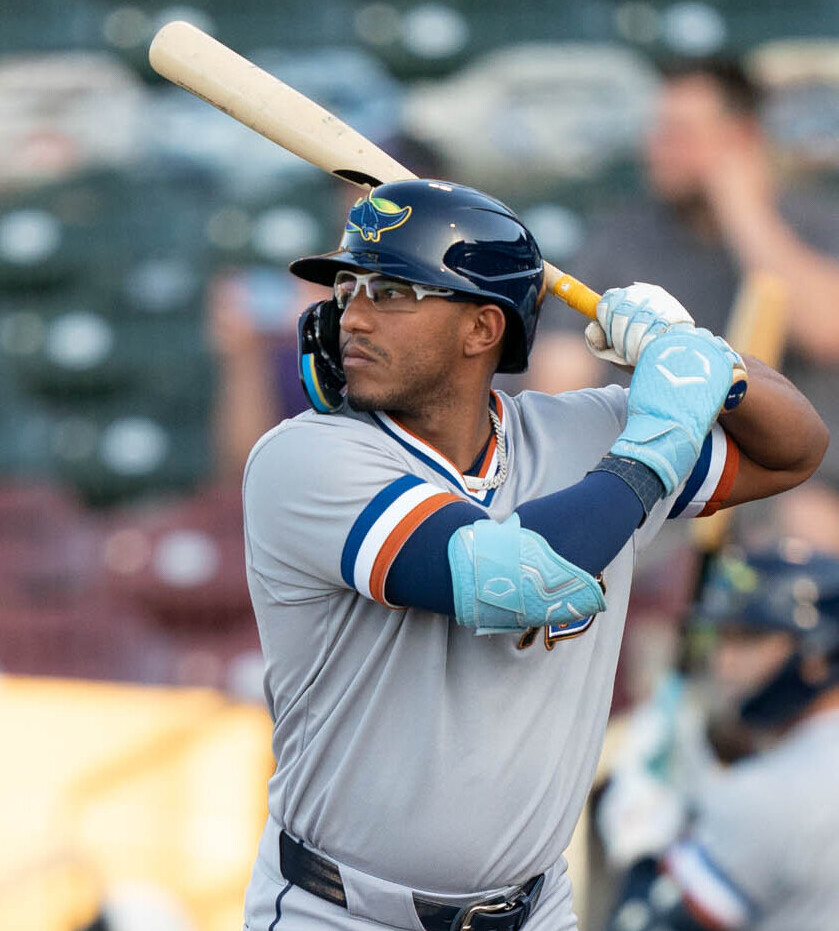
- Palacios with the Durham Bulls in 2025

Tampa Bay Rays – No. 1
- Second baseman / Outfielder
- Born: May 16, 1997 (age 29); Brooklyn, New York, U.S.
- Bats: Left Throws: Right

MLB debut
- April 25, 2022, for the Cleveland Guardians

MLB statistics (through 2026 season)
- Batting average: .238
- Home runs: 22
- Runs batted in: 107
- Stats at Baseball Reference

Teams
- Cleveland Guardians (2022); St. Louis Cardinals (2023); Tampa Bay Rays (2024–present)

Richard Jordan Palacios (born May 16, 1997) is an American professional baseball second baseman and outfielder for the Tampa Bay Rays of Major League Baseball (MLB). He has previously played in MLB for the Cleveland Guardians and St. Louis Cardinals.

== Amateur career ==
Palacios attended Berkeley Carroll School in New York City and played college baseball at Towson University. In 2016, he played collegiate summer baseball with the Wisconsin Rapids Rafters of the Northwoods League and in 2017 with the Bourne Braves of the Cape Cod Baseball League.

== Professional career ==
=== Cleveland Indians / Guardians ===
The Cleveland Indians drafted Palacios in the third round of the 2018 Major League Baseball draft. He made his professional debut that summer with the Arizona League Indians, Mahoning Valley Scrappers, and Lake County Captains, batting .361 with six home runs and 30 runs batted in over 45 games. He did not play in 2019 due to a torn labrum or in 2020 because the season was canceled due to the COVID-19 pandemic. He started 2021 with the Akron RubberDucks before being promoted to the Columbus Clippers. Over 103 games between the two teams, he slashed .297/.404/.471 with seven home runs, 48 runs batted in, 33 doubles, and twenty stolen bases.

The newly-named Cleveland Guardians selected Palacios to their 40-man roster on November 19, 2021.

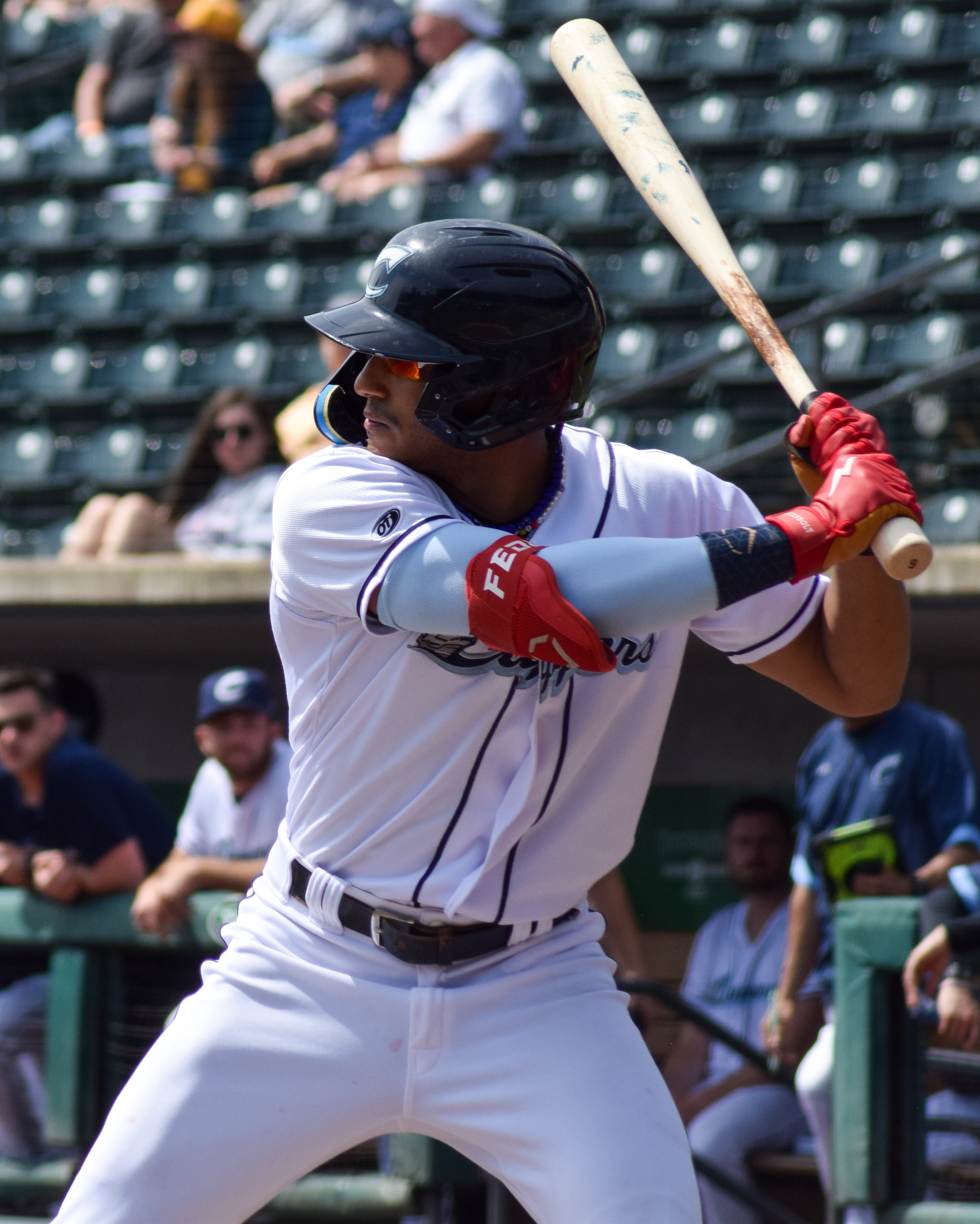
Palacios with the Columbus Clippers in 2023

After beginning the 2022 season with the Triple-A Columbus Clippers, Palacios was recalled by the Guardians on April 25, 2022, and made his major league debut that same day, starting in left field. He collected his first career hit in the same game, a single off of Los Angeles Angels starter Michael Lorenzen. He played in 54 games during his rookie campaign, hitting .232/.293/.286 with no home runs and 10 RBI.

Palacios was optioned to Triple-A Columbus to begin the 2023 season. In 56 games with Columbus, Palacios batted .217/.351/.318 with 3 home runs, 30 RBI, and 6 stolen bases. On June 11, 2023, Palacios was designated for assignment by the Guardians after Cody Morris was returned from the injured list.

=== St. Louis Cardinals ===
On June 16, 2023, Palacios was traded to the St. Louis Cardinals in exchange for cash considerations. In 32 games for the Cardinals, he batted .258/.307/.516 with 6 home runs and 16 RBI.

=== Tampa Bay Rays ===
On January 5, 2024, the Cardinals traded Palacios to the Tampa Bay Rays in exchange for pitcher Andrew Kittredge. In August, Palacios went on the injured list after injuring his knee while sliding headfirst into second base. In his first season with the Rays, he played in a career-high 92 MLB games, batting .223 with five home runs and 19 stolen bases.

After starting the 2025 season on the injured list with a fractured right ring finger, he played in one Rays game, going 3-for-4, before returning to the injured list with another knee sprain. Palacios was activated from the injured list on September 1, 2025.

Palacios was initially optioned to the Triple-A Durham Bulls to begin the 2026 season. However, following an injury to Gavin Lux, the Rays added Palacios to their Opening Day roster.

== International career ==
Palacios is eligible to represent the Netherlands and Curaçao (through his Curaçaoan mother), Puerto Rico (through his father), and the United States (his birthplace) in international baseball competitions. He played for the Dutch team at the 2023 World Baseball Classic, going 0-for-3 in his lone appearance, a 9–5 loss to Taiwan.

== Personal life ==
Palacios's brother, Joshua Palacios, also plays professional baseball and is in the Pittsburgh Pirates organization. Their uncle, Rey Palacios, played in MLB from 1988 to 1990. Their father, Richard also played baseball, reaching Triple-A. Palacios' father is of Puerto Rican descent, and his mother is from Curaçao.

Palacios attended Derek Jeter's last game at Yankee Stadium.
