= Trevor Stephan =

American baseball player (born 1995)

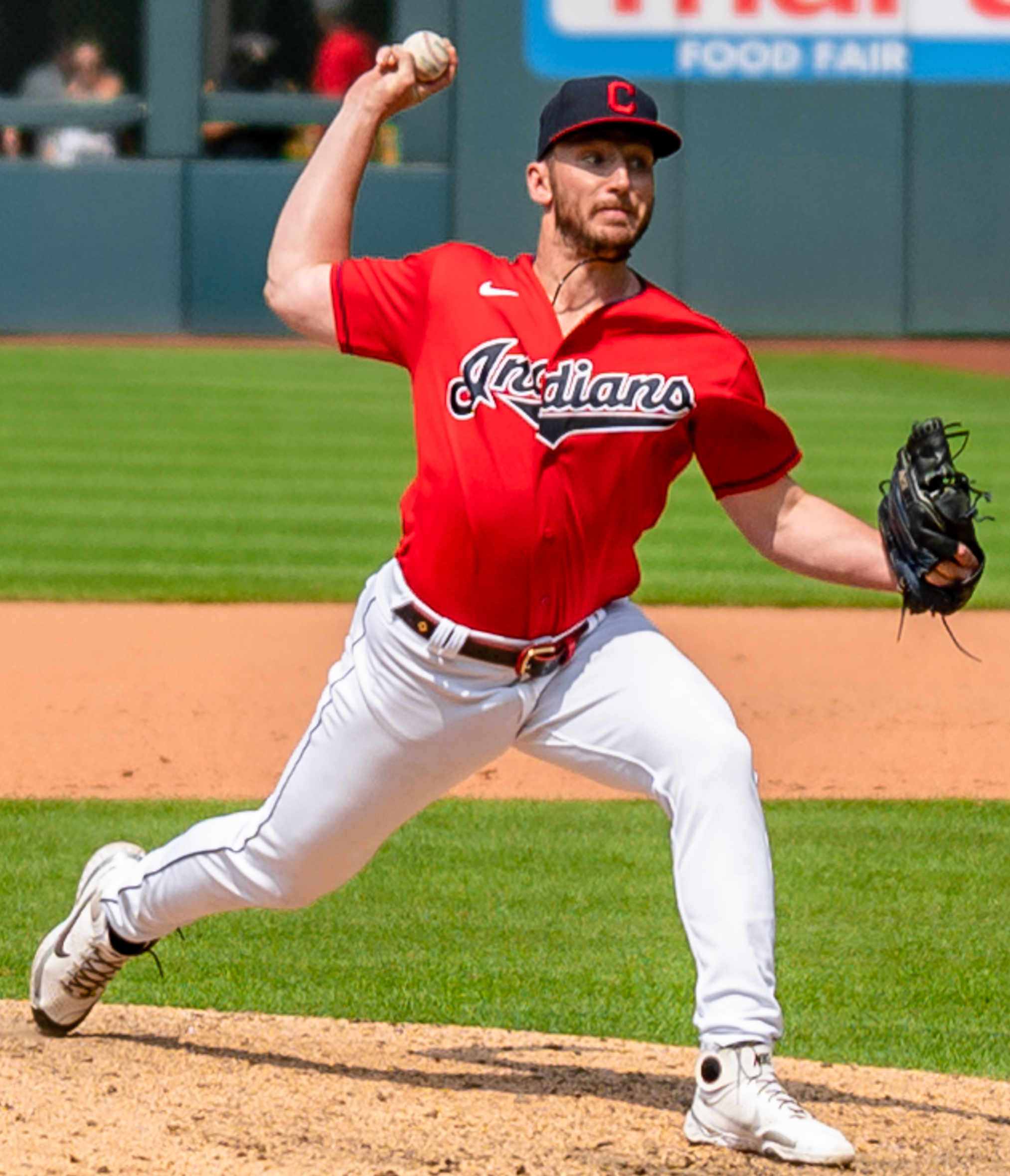
- Stephan with the Cleveland Indians in 2021

Free agent
- Pitcher
- Born: November 25, 1995 (age 30); Austin, Texas, U.S.
- Bats: Right Throws: Right

MLB debut
- April 3, 2021, for the Cleveland Indians

MLB statistics (through 2023 season)
- Win–loss record: 16–13
- Earned run average: 3.73
- Strikeouts: 232
- Stats at Baseball Reference

Teams
- Cleveland Indians / Guardians (2021–2023)

Trevor Richard Stephan (/ˈstɛfɪn/ STEF-in; born November 25, 1995) is an American professional baseball pitcher who is currently a free agent. Stephan played college baseball for Hill College and the University of Arkansas. The New York Yankees selected Stephan in the third round of the 2017 MLB draft. He made his Major League Baseball (MLB) debut in 2021. He was a pitcher in the Cleveland Guardians organization from 2021 until 2026.

== Amateur career ==
Stephan attended Magnolia West High School in Magnolia, Texas. A three-year varsity starter for the baseball team, sophomore through his senior season. He played as a third baseman or first baseman and was the cleanup hitter in the batting order. In the last half of his high school senior season he was also used as a closing pitcher.

After graduating from Magnolia West, Stephan enrolled at Hill College. He played college baseball at Hill College as a pitcher for two years. In his freshman year, Stephan had a 0–1 win–loss record, 6.57 earned run average (ERA), and 19 strikeouts while pitching 12 1/3 total innings. Stephan was primarily used as a closing pitcher or late inning stopper in his sophomore year, amassing 29 appearances for second most nationally of all NJCAA D1 baseball pitchers in the 2016 season. He posted an 8–1 win–loss record, a 2.88 ERA, five saves, and 88 strikeouts in 68 2/3 innings pitched earning NTJCAC first team All-Conference honors.

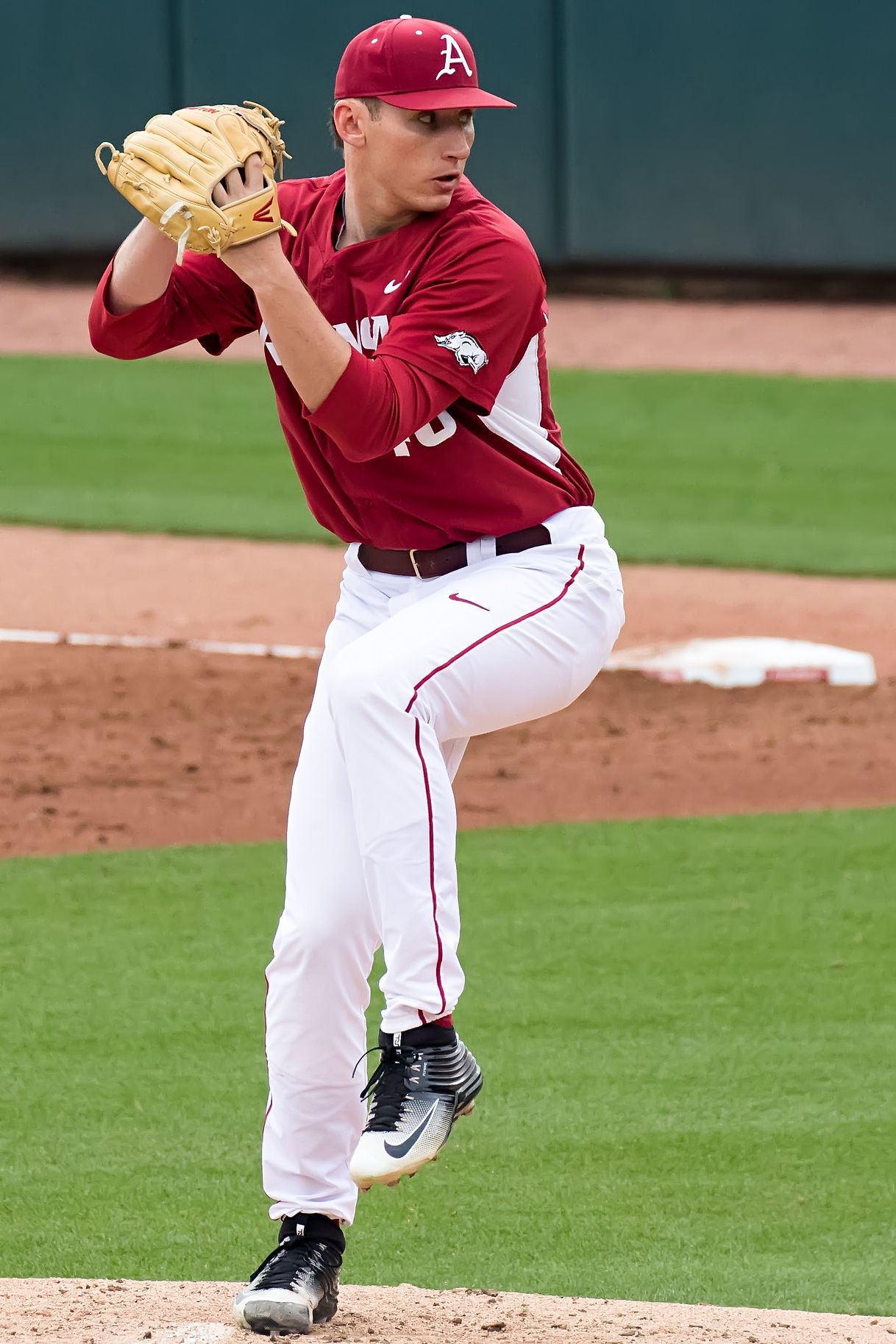
Stephan pitching for Arkansas in 2017

The Boston Red Sox selected Stephan in the 18th round, with the 538th overall selection, of the 2016 MLB draft. He negotiated with the Red Sox, but opted not to sign with them, and instead transferred to the University of Arkansas. Pitching for the Arkansas Razorbacks in 2017, Stephan had a 6–3 win–loss record, a 2.87 earned run average, and 120 strikeouts in 91 innings pitched across 16 games started. His 120 strikeouts rank 5th and his 11.87 strikeouts per nine innings ranks 2nd in University of Arkansas baseball single season history. On May 9, 2017, the Southeastern Conference named Stephan their Pitcher of the Week.

== Professional career ==
=== New York Yankees ===
The New York Yankees selected Stephan in the third round, with the 92nd overall selection, of the 2017 MLB draft. and he signed for $800,000. After signing, Stephan made his professional debut for the Gulf Coast Yankees of the rookie–level Gulf Coast League. After one game, he was promoted to the Staten Island Yankees of the Low–A New York-Penn League, where he spent the remainder of the season, going 1–1 with a 1.39 ERA and 0.80 WHIP in ten games (nine starts).

Stephan began the 2018 season with the Tampa Tarpons of the High–A Florida State League. He had a 1.98 ERA in 41 innings with 49 strikeouts to nine walks. The Yankees promoted him to the Trenton Thunder of the Double–A Eastern League in May. In 24 starts between the two clubs, he was 6–9 with a 3.69 ERA. Stephan returned to Trenton to begin 2019. In 20 games (19 starts) between Trenton and Tampa, he accumulated a 4–7 record and 4.73 ERA with 91 strikeouts across 80 innings. Stephan did not play in a game in 2020 due to the cancellation of the minor league season because of the COVID-19 pandemic.

=== Cleveland Indians / Guardians ===
The Cleveland Indians selected Stephan from the Yankees in the Rule 5 draft on December 10, 2020. He made Cleveland's 2021 Opening Day roster and made his MLB debut on April 3. In 43 appearances during his rookie campaign, Stephan logged a 3-1 record and 4.41 ERA with 75 strikeouts across 63 1/3 innings pitched.

In 2022, Stephan made 66 appearances out of the bullpen for Cleveland, compiling a 6–5 record and 2.69 ERA with 82 strikeouts and three saves over 63 2/3 innings, with a 1.178 WHIP.

On March 30, 2023, Stephan signed a 4-year major league contract with the Guardians worth $10 million. The deal includes club options for the 2027 and 2028 seasons. He made 71 appearances out of the bullpen for Cleveland, recording a 4.06 ERA with 75 strikeouts and two saves across 68 2/3 innings pitched.

On March 14, 2024, it was announced that Stephan would undergo Tommy John surgery to repair his UCL, ending his season. In 2025, Stephan began the year making 15 rehab appearances split between the rookie-level Arizona Complex League Guardians, Double-A Akron RubberDucks, and Triple-A Columbus Clippers, in which he struggled to a 9.22 ERA with 15 strikeouts across 13 2/3 innings of work. On August 15, 2025, Stephan was removed from the 40-man roster and sent outright to Triple-A Columbus.

On October 30, 2026, following two seasons in the Guardians minor league system, Stephan had his club option declined.

== See also ==
- Rule 5 draft results
