= Sam Hentges =

American baseball player (born 1996)

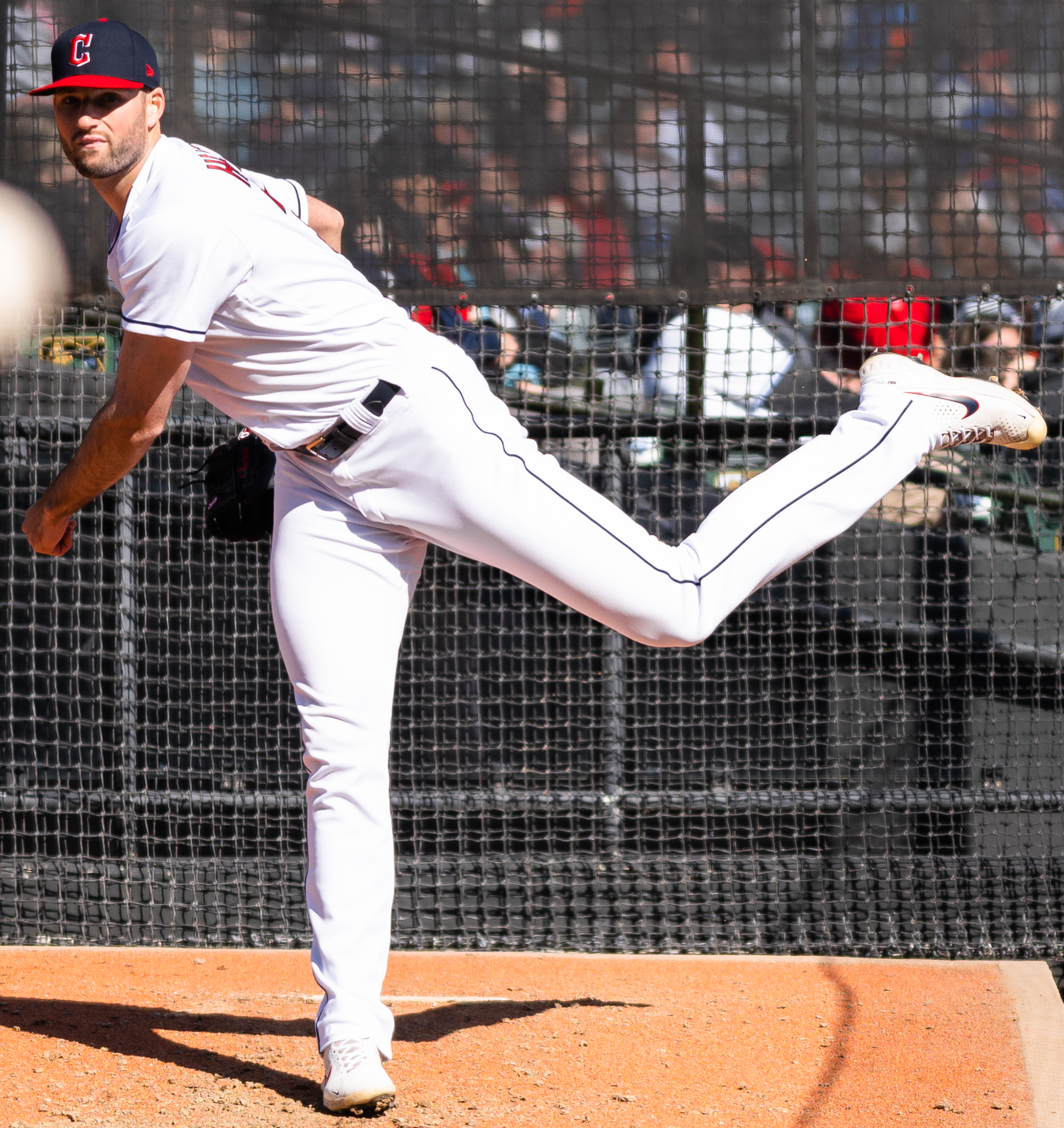
- Hentges with the Cleveland Guardians in 2022

San Francisco Giants – No. 31
- Pitcher
- Born: July 18, 1996 (age 30); Shoreview, Minnesota, U.S.
- Bats: Left Throws: Left

MLB debut
- April 20, 2021, for the Cleveland Indians

MLB statistics (through 2026 season)
- Win–loss record: 8–15
- Earned run average: 4.03
- Strikeouts: 264
- Stats at Baseball Reference

Teams
- Cleveland Indians / Guardians (2021–2024); San Francisco Giants (2026–present)

Samuel David Hentges (born July 18, 1996) is an American professional baseball pitcher for the San Francisco Giants of Major League Baseball (MLB). He has previously played in MLB for the Cleveland Indians / Guardians. He was selected by the Indians in the fourth round of the 2014 MLB draft, and made his MLB debut in 2021.

== Amateur career ==
Hentges attended Mounds View High School in Arden Hills, Minnesota and as a senior in 2014, was the St. Paul Pioneer Press baseball player of the year. He committed to play college baseball at the University of Arkansas.

== Professional career ==
=== Cleveland Indians / Guardians ===
Hentges was drafted by the Cleveland Indians in the fourth round of the 2014 Major League Baseball draft. He signed with the Indians, forgoing his commitment to Arkansas, and made his professional debut with the Arizona League Indians, compiling a 0.69 ERA in 13 innings.

Hentges pitched 2015 with the Arizona League Indians and Mahoning Valley Scrappers, pitching to a combined 3–5 record and 4.37 ERA in 13 total games (11 starts) between both teams. He started 2016 with the Lake County Captains, but had his season ended early after undergoing Tommy John surgery. He returned in 2017 and played with the Arizona League Indians and Mahoning Valley, going 0–4 with a 3.23 ERA in 11 starts. In 2018, Hentges played with the Lynchburg Hillcats where he was 6–6 with a 3.27 ERA in 23 starts.

The Indians added Hentges to their 40-man roster on November 20, 2018, in order to protect him from the Rule 5 draft. He began 2019 with the Akron RubberDucks. He did not play in a game in 2020 due to the cancellation of the minor league season because of the COVID-19 pandemic.

On April 17, 2021, Hentges was promoted to the major leagues for the first time. He made his MLB debut on April 20, giving up one run in one inning pitched against the Chicago White Sox. Hentges made 30 appearances (12 starts) for Cleveland during his rookie campaign, posting a 1–4 record and 6.68 ERA with 68 strikeouts across 68 2/3 innings pitched.

On September 19, 2022, while pitching against the Minnesota Twins, Hentges tossed 2 1/3 perfect innings to earn his first career save. In 2022, Hentges made 57 appearances out of the bullpen for Cleveland, and went 3–2 with a 2.32 ERA, 0.968 WHIP and 72 strikeouts across 62 innings. Hentges pitched in 56 contests for the Guardians in 2023, compiling a 3–2 record and 3.61 ERA with 56 strikeouts across 52 1/3 innings pitched.

Hentges began the 2024 campaign with Cleveland, compiling a 3.04 ERA with 27 strikeouts over 25 games. He was placed on the injured list with left shoulder inflammation on July 12, 2024, and was transferred to the 60–day injured list on August 19. On September 10, it was announced that Hentges would require surgery to repair the labrum and capsule in his left shoulder, necessitating a recovery timetable of 12–14 months.

On September 26, 2025, it was announced that Hentges had undergone arthroscopic surgery on his right knee, and would miss three-to-four months in recovery. On November 21, Hentges was non-tendered by the Guardians and became a free agent.

=== San Francisco Giants ===
On December 3, 2025, Hentges signed a one-year, $1.4 million contract with the San Francisco Giants.

On June 12, 2026, Hentges refused to wear a hat that featured a rainbow Giants logo, during the Giants' Pride Night event, opting for a hat with the regular logo. Hentges' action, alongside teammates Landen Roupp, Ryan Walker and JT Brubaker, who each wrote the Bible passage Genesis 9:12–16 on their respective hats, drew criticism from local outlets and fans, given the region's long history with the LGBTQ community.
