= Will Benson =

American baseball player (born 1998)

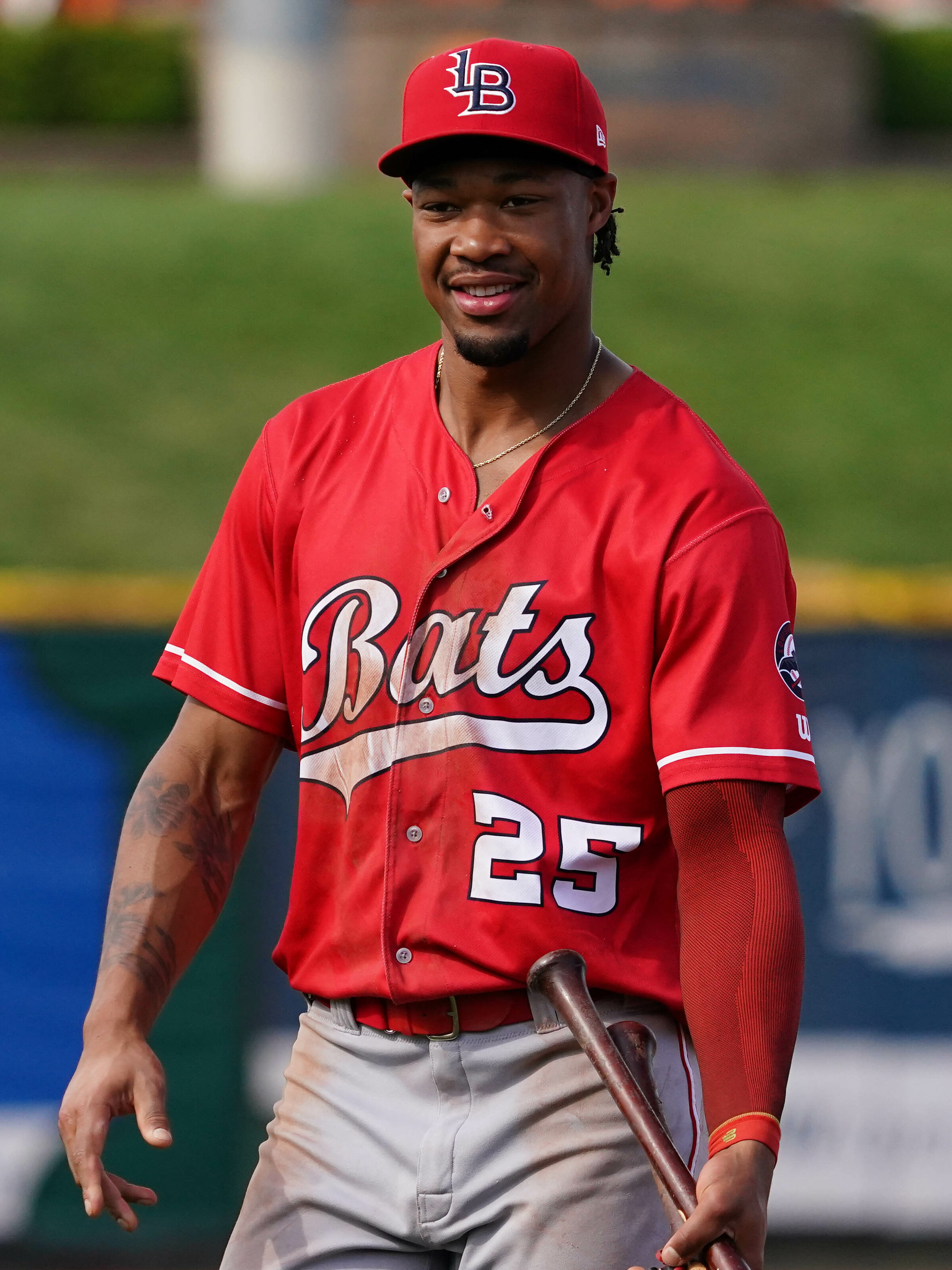
- Benson with the Louisville Bats in 2023

Free agent
- Outfielder
- Born: June 16, 1998 (age 28); Atlanta, Georgia, U.S.
- Bats: Left Throws: Left

MLB debut
- August 1, 2022, for the Cleveland Guardians

MLB statistics (through 2026 season)
- Batting average: .221
- Home runs: 40
- Runs batted in: 124
- Stats at Baseball Reference

Teams
- Cleveland Guardians (2022); Cincinnati Reds (2023–2026)
Medals
Men's baseball
Representing United States
U-18 Baseball World Cup
Gold medal – first place	2015 Osaka	Team

William Buchanan Benson (born June 16, 1998) is an American professional baseball outfielder who is a free agent. He has previously played in Major League Baseball (MLB) for the Cleveland Guardians and Cincinnati Reds. Benson was selected by the Cleveland Indians in the first round of the 2016 MLB draft and made his MLB debut in 2022.

== Career ==
=== Cleveland Indians / Guardians ===
The Cleveland Indians selected Benson in the first round, with the 14th overall selection, of the 2016 Major League Baseball draft out of The Westminster Schools in Atlanta, Georgia. He was committed to attend Duke University to play college baseball for the Duke Blue Devils, but instead signed with the Indians for a $2.5 million signing bonus. Benson also played for the national under-18 team that won the 2015 U-18 Baseball World Cup.

Benson made his professional debut in 2016 with the Rookie-level Arizona League Indians where he posted a .209 batting average with six home runs and 27 runs batted in during 44 games. In 2017, he played for the Mahoning Valley Scrappers of the Low-A New York–Penn League where he batted .238 with ten home runs and 36 runs batted in during 56 games, and in 2018, he played with the Lake County Captains of the Single-A South Atlantic League, hitting .180 with 22 home runs and 58 runs batted in during 123 games. He returned to Lake County to begin 2019. On April 18, 2019, he hit four home runs in one game. Benson was promoted to the Lynchburg Hillcats of the High-A Carolina League in June after hitting .272 with 18 home runs and 55 runs batted in during 62 games with Lake County. Over 61 games in Lynchburg, he batted .189 with four home runs and 23 runs batted in. Following his poor performance, he considered quitting baseball.

In July 2020, Benson signed on to play for Team Texas of the Constellation Energy League (a makeshift four-team independent league created as a result of the COVID-19 pandemic) for the 2020 season.

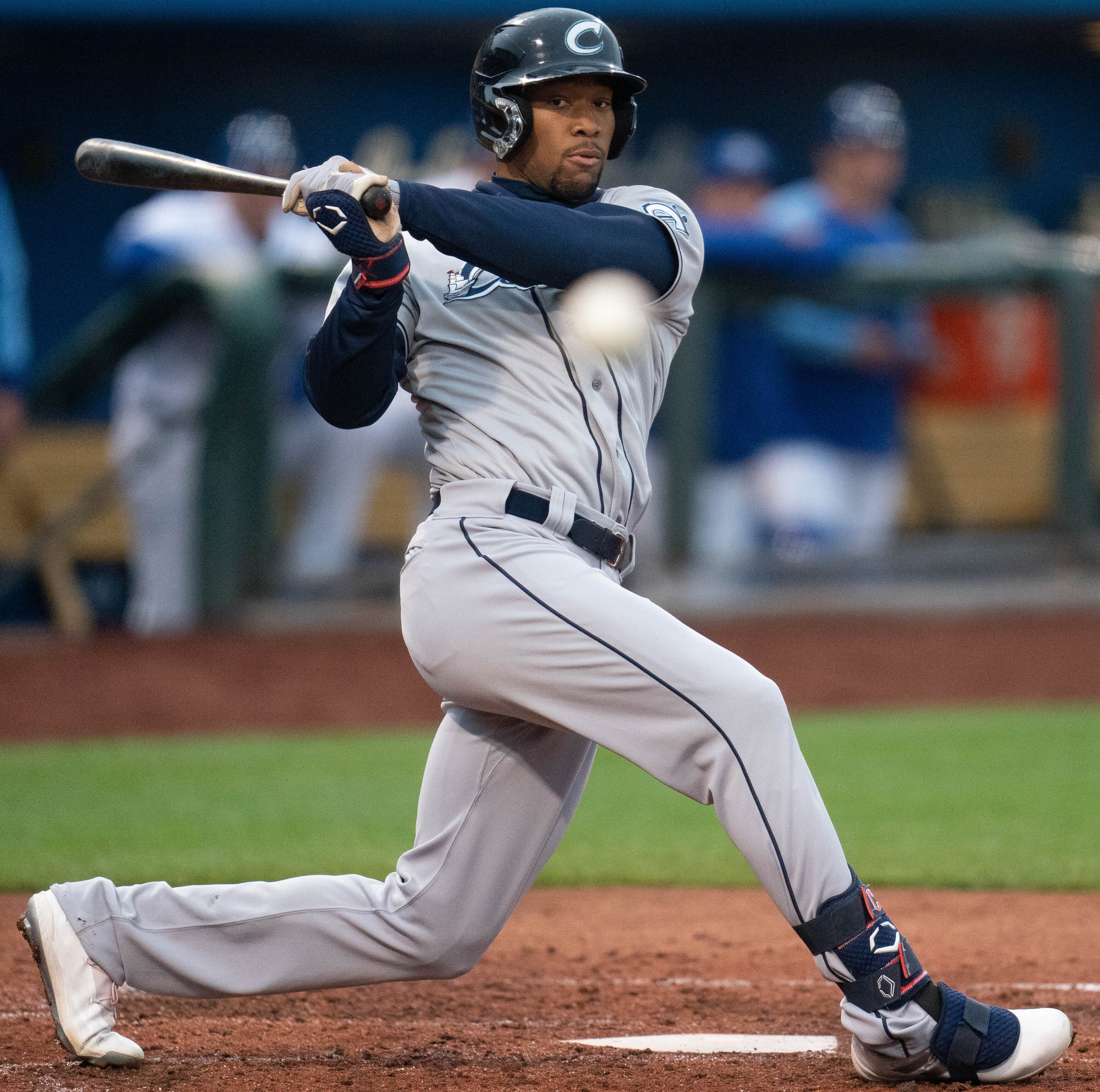
Benson in 2022 with the Columbus Clippers

He batted .143 in 24 games. He began the 2021 season with the Akron RubberDucks of the Double-A Northeast, moving up to the Triple-A Columbus Clippers in August.

In 2022, Benson batted .279 in 89 games in Triple-A. The Guardians selected Benson's contract on August 1. On August 10, Benson collected his first career hit, an RBI single off of Drew Hutchison of the Detroit Tigers. He batted .182 and struck out 19 times in 61 plate appearances.

=== Cincinnati Reds ===
Benson was traded to the Cincinnati Reds on February 8, 2023 for minor league outfielder Justin Boyd and pitcher Steve Hajjar. Benson began the 2023 season with the Reds but was demoted to the Louisville Bats after getting one hit in eight games. On June 7, Benson hit his first major league home run, a walk-off against the Los Angeles Dodgers. He played in 108 games for the Reds, batting .275/.365/.498 with 11 home runs, 31 RBI, and 19 stolen bases.

Benson played in 128 games for Cincinnati during the 2024 campaign, slashing .187/.274/.376 with 14 home runs, 43 RBI, and 16 stolen bases. He struggled with strikeouts, fanning on almost 40 percent of plate appearances, up from 31 percent in 2023.

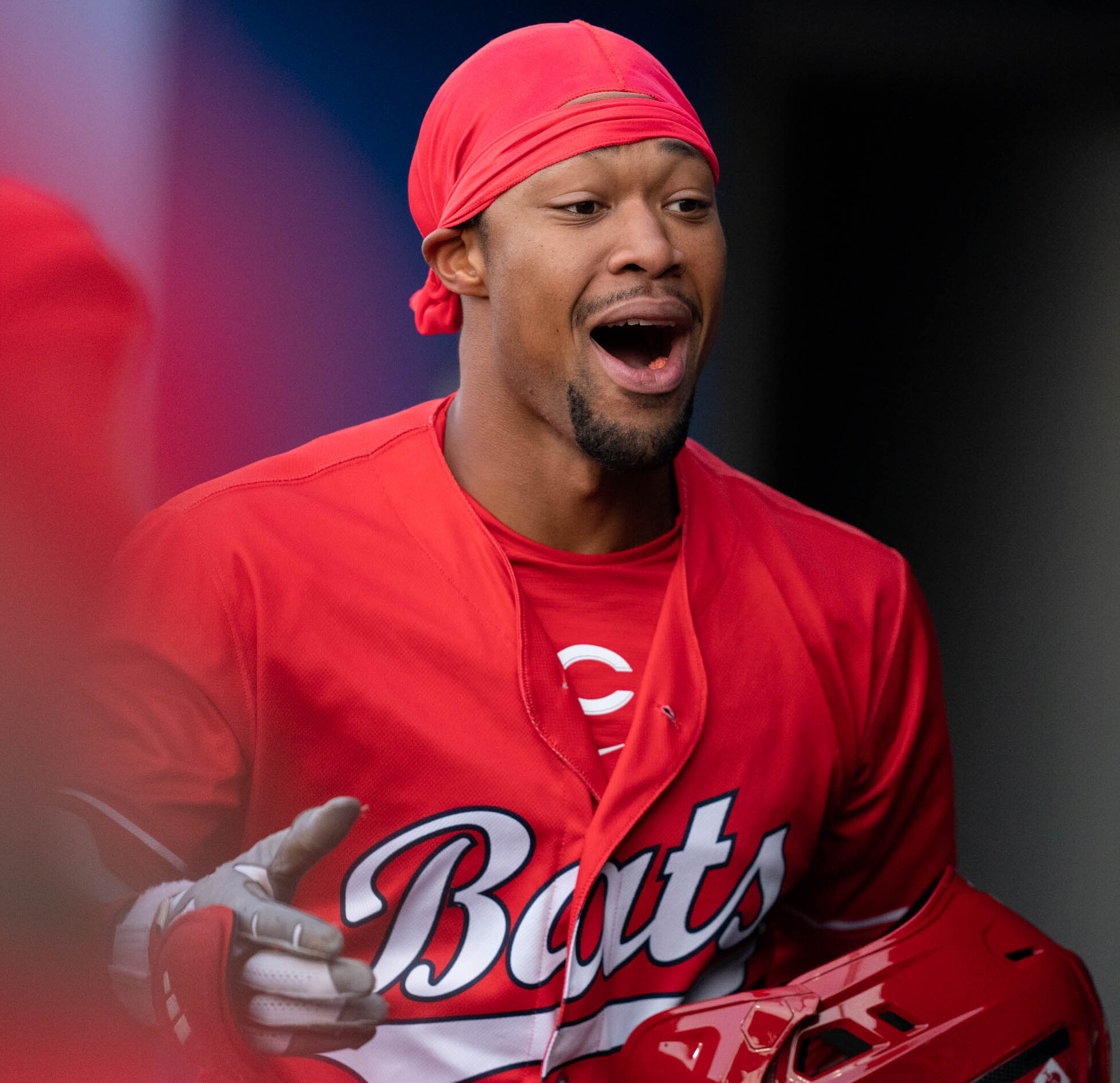
Benson with Louisville in 2025

Benson was optioned to Triple-A Louisville to begin the 2025 season. He was called up to Cincinnati from April 8 to 12, then again on May 9. He homered in four straight games from May 15 to 18, all Reds wins. Benson was named the National League Player of the Week for the eighth week of the season after going 10-for-19 (.526) with five home runs and 10 RBI in that period. He was the first Red to win the award since Rece Hinds won the previous July. Benson returned to the minors in August but was promoted back to Cincinnati when the team designated Jake Fraley for assignment.

On April 19, 2026, in a game against the Minnesota Twins, Benson scored two runs in a game without seeing a single pitch. This is believed to be the first time an MLB player scored two or more runs in a game without seeing a single pitch since King Kelley achieved the feat on June 27, 1887.

Benson played in 51 games for the Reds in 2026, slashing .188/.310/.333 with three home runs, six RBI, and one stolen bases. Benson was designated for assignment by Cincinnati on July 4. He cleared waivers and was sent outright to the Triple-A Louisville Bats on July 8. He elected free agency on October 3.

== Personal life ==
Benson and his wife Lindsey have a son and a daughter.

Benson's father, Ted, played college basketball for the Purdue Boilermakers. He has an older brother, Theodore Charles, who died as a five year old after being hit by a school bus. He also has a mother and sister.

Benson has been friends since childhood with MLB player Xzavion Curry. They both played for the Guardians in 2022 and Curry made his MLB debut 14 days after Benson.

Benson plays chess and played with former teammates Steven Kwan and Joey Votto.

Before signing with Cleveland, Benson planned to walk-on for the Duke Blue Devils basketball team.
