= Will Brennan =

American baseball player (born 1998)

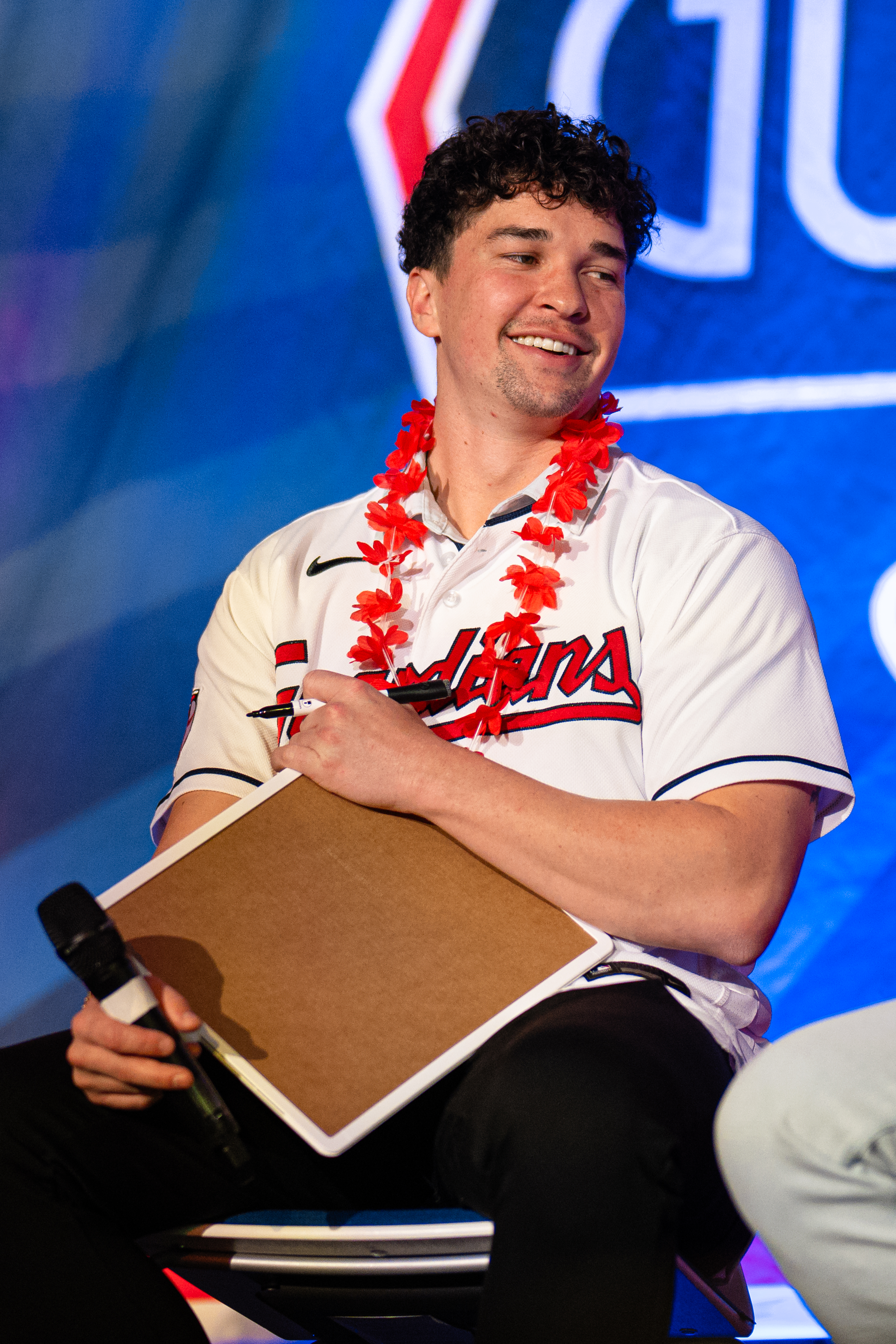
- Brennan with the Cleveland Guardians in 2024

Free agent
- Outfielder
- Born: February 2, 1998 (age 28); Colorado Springs, Colorado, U.S.
- Bats: Left Throws: Left

MLB debut
- September 21, 2022, for the Cleveland Guardians

MLB statistics (through 2026 season)
- Batting average: .263
- Home runs: 14
- Runs batted in: 79
- Stats at Baseball Reference

Teams
- Cleveland Guardians (2022–2025); San Francisco Giants (2026)

William Daniel Brennan (born February 2, 1998) is an American professional baseball outfielder who is a free agent. He has previously played in Major League Baseball (MLB) for the Cleveland Guardians and San Francisco Giants. He played college baseball for the Kansas State Wildcats.

== Amateur career ==
Brennan graduated from Blue Valley High School in Overland Park, Kansas. He enrolled at Kansas State University, where he played college baseball for the Kansas State Wildcats for three seasons, from 2017 to 2019. He batted .350 with 64 hits as a freshman and was named second team All-Big 12 Conference and a Freshman All-American by the Collegiate Baseball Newspaper and the National Collegiate Baseball Writers Association. Following the season, Brennan played collegiate summer baseball with the Anchorage Glacier Pilots of the Alaska Baseball League. He was named first team All-Big 12 after batting .359 with 79 hits, 49 runs scored, and 19 stolen bases. During the summer of 2018, he played for the Falmouth Commodores of the Cape Cod Baseball League. Brennan batted .292 as a junior. He was also a pitcher in 2018 and 2019, with a 5.51 ERA in 80 innings for the Wildcats.

== Professional career ==
=== Cleveland Indians / Guardians ===
==== Minor leagues ====
The Cleveland Indians drafted Brennan in the eighth round, with the 250th overall selection, of the 2019 Major League Baseball draft. After signing with the team he was initially assigned to the rookie-level Arizona League Indians before being promoted to the Low-A Mahoning Valley Scrappers. Brennan did not play in a game in 2020 due to the cancellation of the minor league season because of the COVID-19 pandemic.

Brennan was assigned to the High-A Lake County Captains at the beginning of the 2021 season. He was promoted to the Double-A Akron RubberDucks after batting .290 in 62 games with Lake County. Brennan began the 2022 season with Akron and was promoted to the Triple-A Columbus Clippers after hitting .304 with 39 RBI, which was leading the Eastern League.

==== Major leagues ====
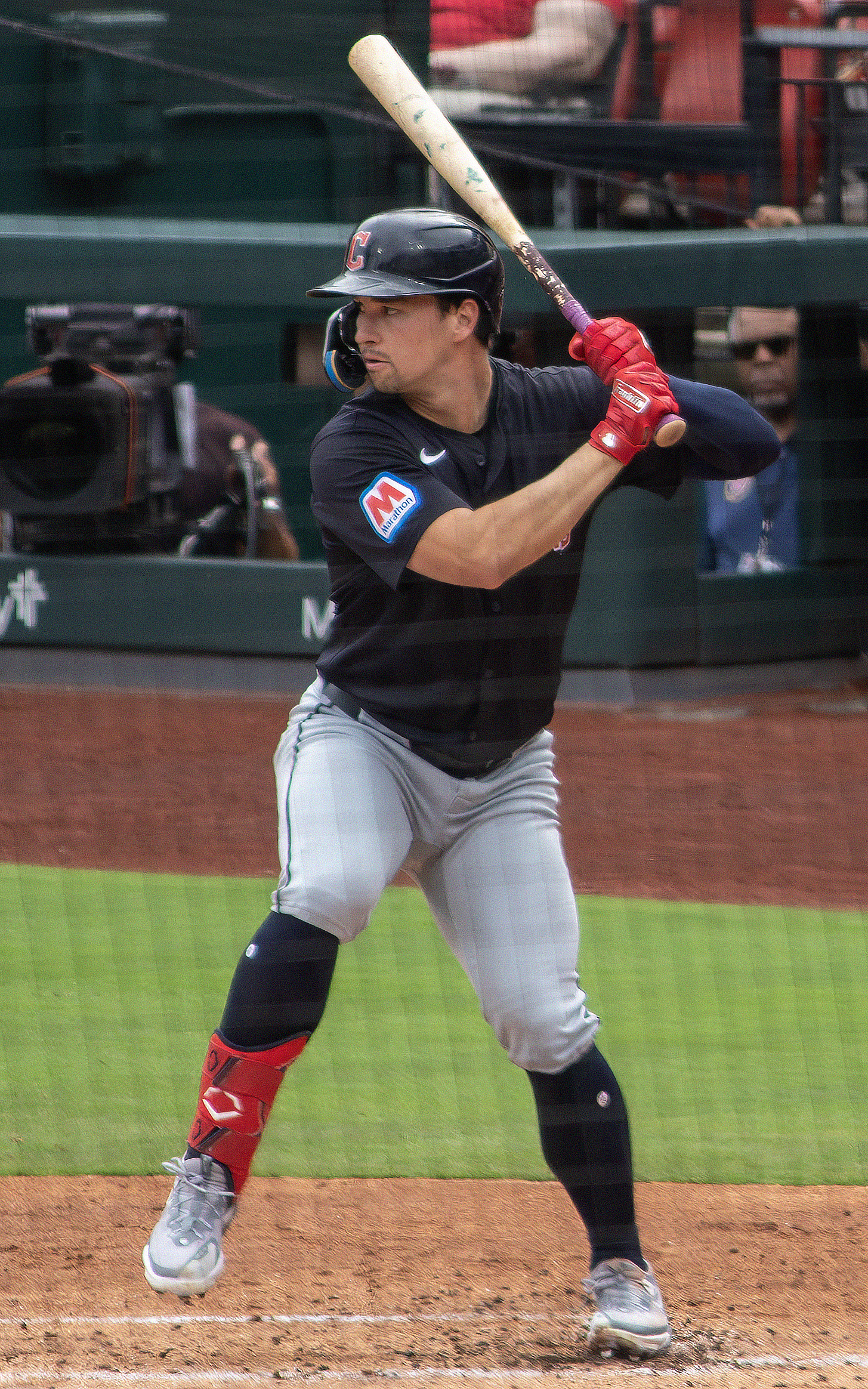
Will Brennan with the Guardians in 2024.

The Guardians selected Brennan's contract on September 21, 2022, adding him to their active roster. He made his major league debut the same day against the Chicago White Sox. Brennan hit his first major home run and triple in the same game off of Max Castillo on October 2. For the season, Brennan hit .357 with eight RBI and one home run in 42 at-bats. In five postseason games, he batted 2-for-11 with one RBI and six strikeouts.

On May 22, 2023, Brennan accidentally hit and killed a bird with a batted ball during a game against the Chicago White Sox. The following day, he hit a home run which he dedicated to the memory of the bird. On June 9, he recorded his first walkoff hit in the 14th inning of a 10-9 win against the Houston Astros. Brennan showed versatility for the Guardians, playing all three outfield positions. He finished the 2023 season with a .266/.299/.356 slash line, five home runs, 41 RBI, and 13 stolen bases across 138 total games.

Brennan made 114 appearances for the Guardians during the 2024 campaign, hitting .264/.309/.388 with eight home runs, 30 RBI, and four stolen bases.

Brennan was optioned to Triple-A Columbus to begin the 2025 season. On May 12, 2025, he was recalled by the Guardians, and went 1-for-11 (.091) with one walk over six appearances for the team. Brennan underwent a season-ending reconstruction of his left UCL on June 9. On September 6, it was announced that Brennan had undergone an additional surgery, this time to correct a lingering groin injury. On November 21, he was non-tendered by the Guardians and became a free agent.

=== San Francisco Giants ===
On February 15, 2026, Brennan signed a one-year, major league contract with the San Francisco Giants. Brennan was optioned to the Triple-A Sacramento River Cats to begin the regular season. He made 11 appearances for San Francisco, going 2-for-23 (.087). On June 10, Brennan was designated for assignment by the Giants. He cleared waivers and was sent outright to Sacramento on June 17. He elected free agency on November 2.
