= Bryan Lavastida =

American baseball player (born 1998)

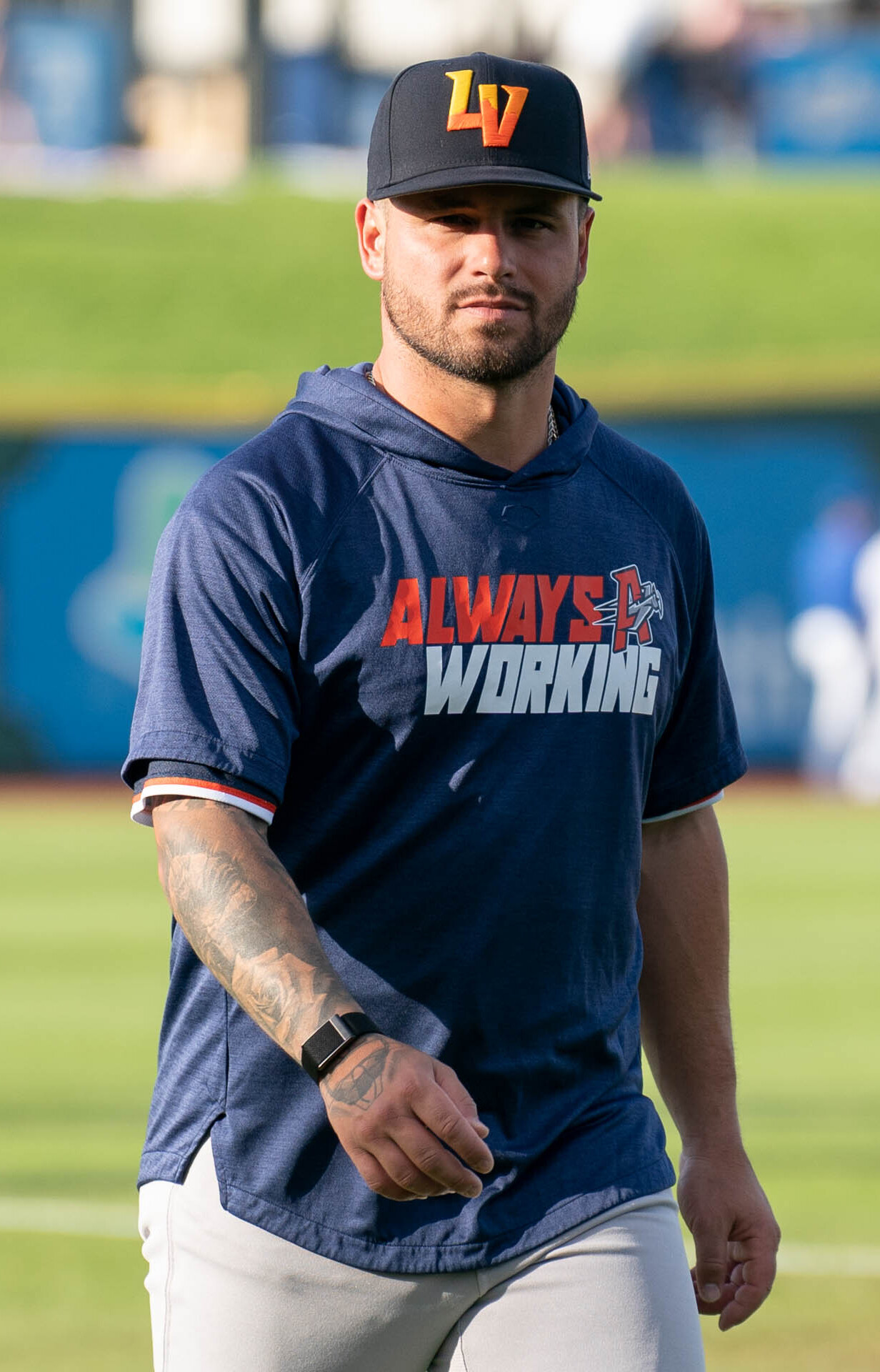
- Lavastida with the Las Vegas Aviators in 2026

Free agent
- Catcher
- Born: November 27, 1998 (age 27); Hialeah, Florida, U.S.
- Bats: Left Throws: Right

MLB debut
- April 10, 2022, for the Cleveland Guardians

MLB statistics (through 2022 season)
- Batting average: .083
- Home runs: 0
- Runs batted in: 0
- Stats at Baseball Reference

Teams
- Cleveland Guardians (2022)

Bryan Lavastida (born November 27, 1998) is an American professional baseball catcher who is a free agent. He has previously played in Major League Baseball (MLB) for the Cleveland Guardians.

== Career ==
=== Cleveland Indians / Guardians ===
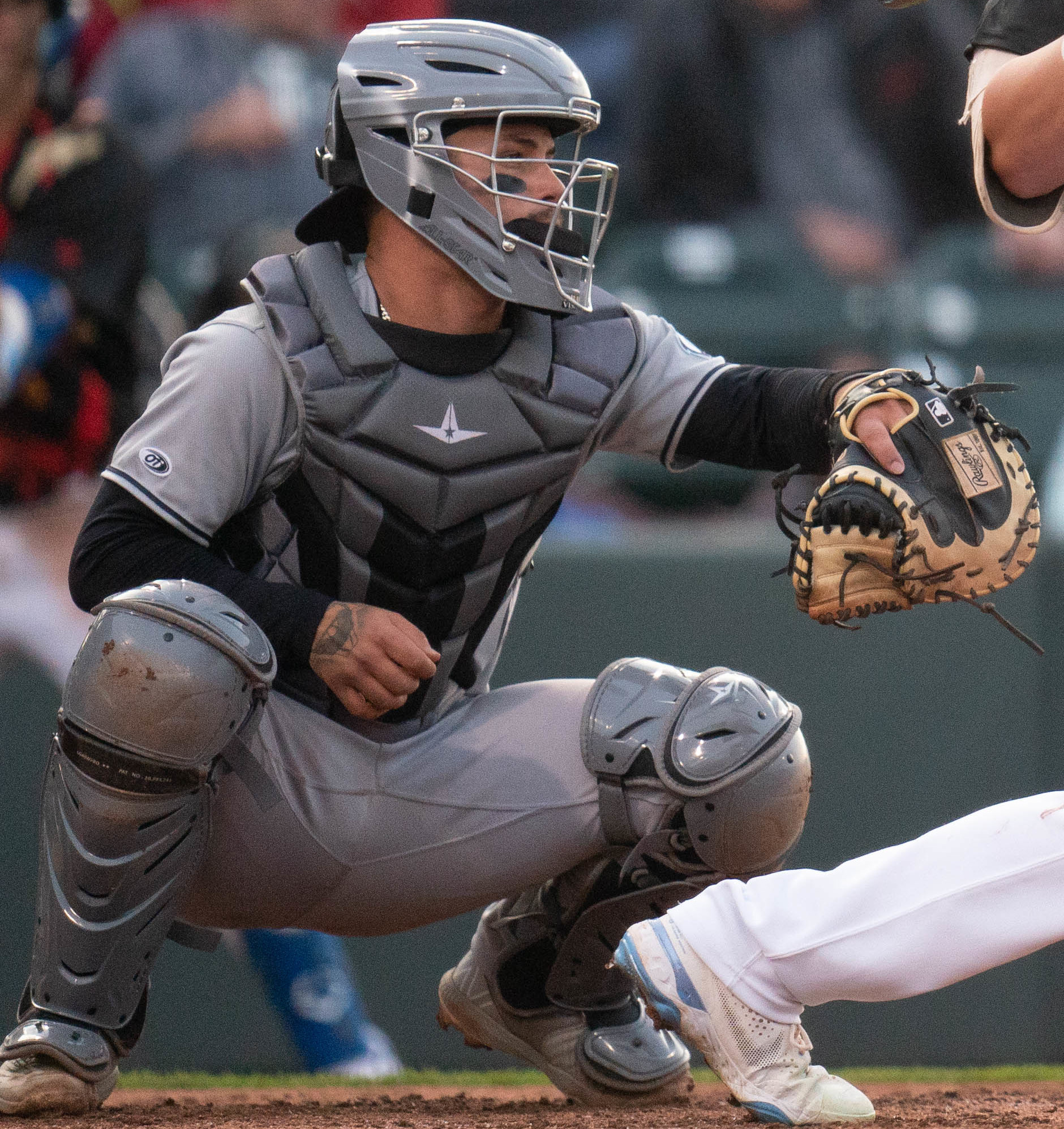
Lavastida with the Columbus Clippers in 2022

Lavastida attended Westland Hialeah Senior High School in Hialeah, Florida, and played college baseball at Hillsborough Community College. He was drafted by the Cleveland Indians in the 15th round, with the 460th overall selection, of the 2018 Major League Baseball draft.

Lavastida made his professional debut with the rookie-level Arizona League Indians, batting .292 over 33 games. He played 2019 with the Low-A Mahoning Valley Scrappers and Single-A Lake County Captains, slashing .335/.410/.481 with two home runs and 38 runs batted in over 59 games. Lavastida did not play in a game in 2020 due to the cancellation of the minor league season because of the COVID-19 pandemic. He started 2021 with Lake County before being promoted to the Double-A Akron RubberDucks. Lavastida was promoted to the Triple-A Columbus Clippers in September. Over 84 games between the two teams, he slashed .289/.380/.456 with nine home runs, 51 runs batted in, and 16 stolen bases.

The newly named Cleveland Guardians selected Lavastida to their 40-man roster on November 19, 2021, in order to protect him from the Rule 5 draft. On April 2, 2022, the Guardians announced that he had been named to their Opening Day roster. He appeared in only 6 games for Cleveland in his rookie campaign, going 1-for-12 with three walks. Lavastida spent the majority of the season with Akron and Columbus, hitting .209/.284/.349 with 9 home runs, 30 RBI, and 7 stolen bases in 84 games.

Lavastida was optioned to Triple-A Columbus to begin the 2023 season. He was designated for assignment on April 23, 2023. After clearing waivers, he was sent outright to Double-A Akron on April 28. In 108 appearances split between Akron and Columbus, Lavastida batted .240/.341/.378 with 12 home runs, 70 RBI, and 16 stolen bases.

Lavastida spent the 2024 campaign with Triple-A Columbus, playing in 87 games and hitting .232/.334/.387 with eight home runs, 42 RBI, and 27 stolen bases. He elected free agency following the season on November 4, 2024.

=== Houston Astros ===
On January 16, 2025, Lavastida signed a minor league contract with the Houston Astros. In 66 appearances split between the Double-A Corpus Christi Hooks and Triple-A Sugar Land Space Cowboys, he batted a combined .252/.346/.389 with six home runs, 22 RBI, and 17 stolen bases. Lavastida was released by the Astros organization on August 4.

=== Athletics ===
On August 15, 2025, Lavastida signed a minor league contract with the Athletics organization. He made 23 appearances for the Triple-A Las Vegas Aviators, slashing .348/.404/.562 with four home runs, 17 RBI, and four stolen bases. Lavastida elected free agency following the season on November 6.

On December 18, 2025, Lavastida re-signed with the Athletics organization on a new minor league contract. In 2026, he appeared in 82 games with Triple-A Las Vegas Aviators he batted .250/.324/.364 with 7 home runs, 48 RBIs and 9 stolen bases. He elected free agency on November 2.
