= Kirk McCarty =

American baseball pitcher (born 1995)

Free agent
- Pitcher
- Born: October 12, 1995 (age 30); Hattiesburg, Mississippi, U.S.
- Bats: Left Throws: Left

Professional debut
- MLB: April 24, 2022, for the Cleveland Guardians
- KBO: April 2, 2023, for the SSG Landers
- CPBL: June 4, 2024, for the CTBC Brothers

MLB statistics (through 2022 season)
- Win–loss record: 4–3
- Earned run average: 4.54
- Strikeouts: 26

KBO statistics (through 2023 season)
- Win–loss record: 9–5
- Earned run average: 3.39
- Strikeouts: 116

CPBL statistics (through 2024 season)
- Win–loss record: 5–3
- Earned run average: 2.76
- Strikeouts: 62
- Stats at Baseball Reference

Teams
- Cleveland Guardians (2022); SSG Landers (2023); CTBC Brothers (2024)

Career highlights and awards
- Taiwan Series champion (2024)

Kirkland McCarty (born October 12, 1995) is an American professional baseball pitcher who is a free agent. He has previously played in Major League Baseball (MLB) for the Cleveland Guardians, in the KBO League for the SSG Landers, and in the Chinese Professional Baseball League (CPBL) for the CTBC Brothers.

== High school and college ==
McCarty went to Oak Grove High School in Hattiesburg, Mississippi, where he played baseball. He was an effective hitter and pitcher in high school, as he hit to a .364 batting average and pitched to a 25–3 record in his high school career. He committed to Southern Miss to play college baseball before the 2015 college baseball season. McCarty worked as both a starter and reliever as a freshman, compiling a 4–1 record and a 4.09 earned run average. Starting with his sophomore season, he played with future Guardians teammate Nick Sandlin. McCarty recorded an 8–1 record and a 3.16 ERA, while leading the Southern Miss team in strikeouts with 89. After his sophomore season in 2016, he played collegiate summer baseball for the Orleans Firebirds of the Cape Cod League, throwing for a 2–1 record with a 1.99 ERA. He became solely a starter for his junior season, pitching to a 3.52 ERA, a 10–2 record, and 103 strikeouts across 17 starts.

== Career ==
=== Cleveland Indians / Guardians ===
McCarty was drafted by the Cleveland Indians with the 222nd overall pick in the 7th round of the 2017 Major League Baseball draft.

McCarty signed for a $250,000 signing bonus on June 24, 2017, forgoing his senior season at Southern Miss. He pitched for the Mahoning Valley Scrappers during the rest of 2017, going 2–2 with an earned run average of 1.85 while working as both a starter and a reliever. He pitched for the Lake County Captains and the Lynchburg Hillcats in 2018, becoming a full–time starter. He pitched to a 5–11 record and a 4.06 earned run average across 146 1/3 innings for both teams. For Lynchburg in 2019, he pitched to a 3–7 record with a 5.66 earned run average across 13 starts. He pitched for the Mesa Solar Sox in the Arizona Fall League after the minor league season was over.

McCarty did not play in a game in 2020 due to the cancellation of the minor league season because of the COVID-19 pandemic. He spent the 2021 season with the Triple-A Columbus Clippers. After beginning the 2022 season with Columbus, the Guardians selected McCarty's contract as a COVID-19 replacement player on April 20, 2022. He made his major league debut on April 24, 2022, and was returned to Columbus the following day. The Guardians selected McCarty's contract once more on May 8. McCarty was designated for assignment following the promotion of Alex Young on July 3.

=== Baltimore Orioles ===
On July 6, 2022, McCarty was claimed off waivers by the Baltimore Orioles. He made one start for the Triple–A Norfolk Tides, allowing three runs on five hits with two strikeouts in four innings of work. On July 12, McCarty was designated for assignment following the waiver claim of Louis Head.

=== Cleveland Guardians (second stint) ===
On July 14, 2022, McCarty was claimed off waivers by the Cleveland Guardians. On July 26, McCarty earned his first career win after tossing four scoreless innings of relief against the Boston Red Sox. In 13 total appearances for Cleveland, he compiled a 4–3 record and 4.54 ERA with 26 strikeouts across 37 2/3 innings pitched. McCarty was designated for assignment once more on November 15, and subsequently released on November 17.

=== SSG Landers ===
On November 27, 2022, McCarty signed with the SSG Landers of the KBO League. He made 24 starts for the team in 2023, registering a 9–5 record and 3.39 ERA with 116 strikeouts across 130 innings pitched. McCarty became a free agent following the season.

=== CTBC Brothers ===
On January 17, 2024, McCarty signed with the CTBC Brothers of the Chinese Professional Baseball League. He was sidelined with left elbow inflammation to begin the season. McCarty ultimately made 13 starts for the team, posting a 5–3 record and 2.76 ERA with 62 strikeouts across 81 2/3 innings pitched. With the Brothers, he won the 2024 Taiwan Series.

On January 9, 2025, McCarty re-signed with the Brothers. He was released by the Brothers on April 2, after struggles during spring training led to him not making the team.
