= Tanner Tully =

American baseball player (born 1994)

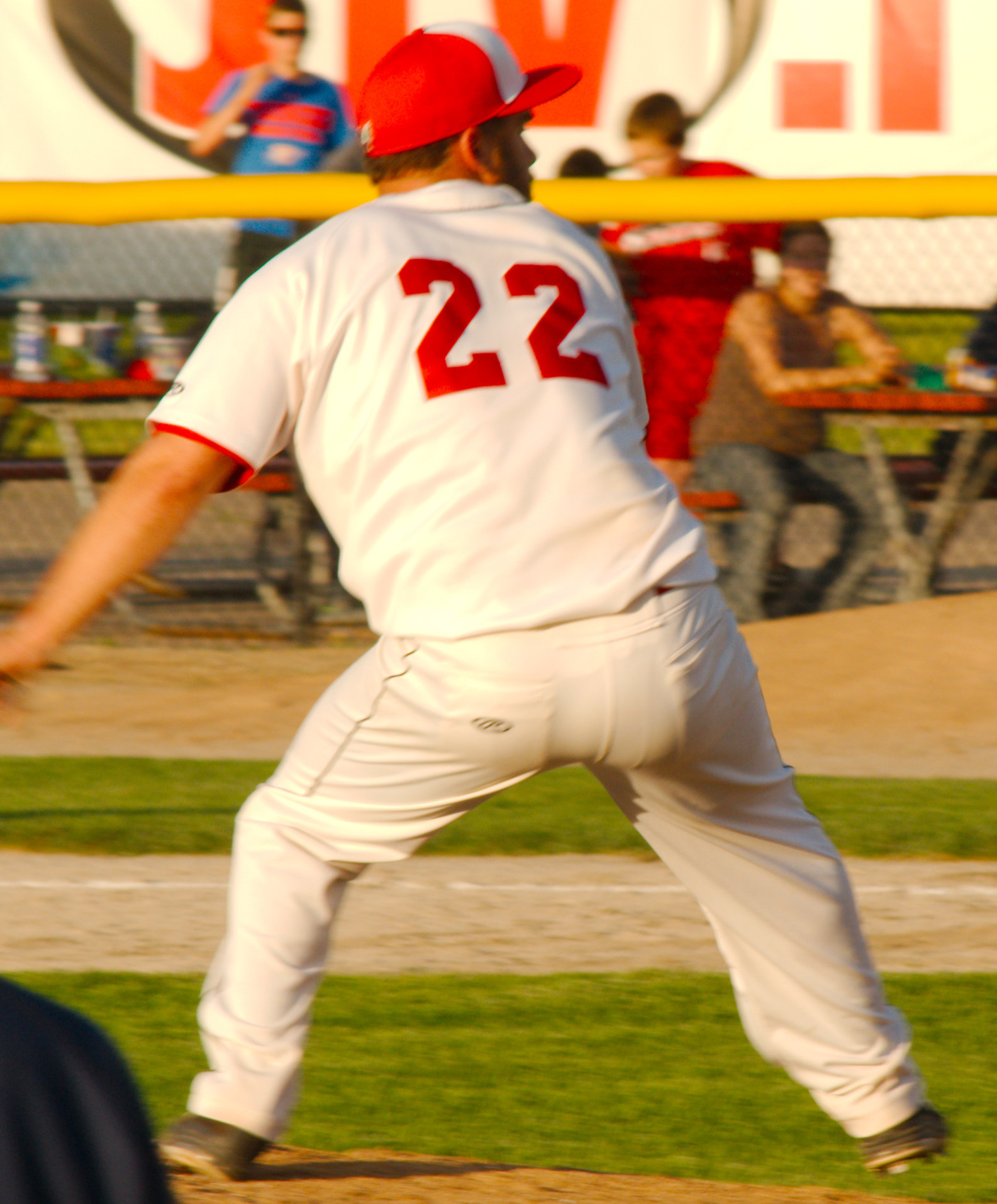
- Tully with the Battle Creek Bombers in 2014

Caliente de Durango – No. 33
- Pitcher
- Born: November 30, 1994 (age 31); Elkhart, Indiana, U.S.
- Bats: Left Throws: Left

Professional debut
- MLB: April 22, 2022, for the Cleveland Guardians
- KBO: August 15, 2023, for the NC Dinos

MLB statistics (through 2022 season)
- Win–loss record: 0–0
- Earned run average: 6.00
- Strikeouts: 2

KBO statistics (through 2023 season)
- Win–loss record: 5–2
- Earned run average: 2.92
- Strikeouts: 47
- Stats at Baseball Reference

Teams
- Cleveland Guardians (2022); NC Dinos (2023)

Tanner Paul Tully (born November 30, 1994) is an American professional baseball pitcher for the Caliente de Durango of the Mexican League. He has previously played in Major League Baseball (MLB) for the Cleveland Guardians and in the KBO League for the NC Dinos.

== Amateur career ==
Tully attended Elkhart Central High School in Elkhart, Indiana, and Ohio State University, where he played college baseball for the Ohio State Buckeyes. In 2015, he played collegiate summer baseball with the Orleans Firebirds of the Cape Cod Baseball League.

== Professional career ==
=== Cleveland Indians / Guardians ===
The Cleveland Indians selected Tully in the 26th round of the 2016 Major League Baseball draft. He made his professional debut with the Low-A Mahoning Valley Scrappers, recording a 1.17 ERA in 13 appearances. In 2017, Tully played for four different Cleveland affiliates; the Single-A Lake County Captains, the High-A Lynchburg Hillcats, the Double-A Akron RubberDucks, and the Triple-A Columbus Clippers. In 25 appearances (15 of them starts) between the four clubs, Tully logged a 6–10 record and 3.69 ERA with 95 strikeouts in 124 1/3 innings pitched. The following year he returned to Lynchburg, going 6–11 with a 4.47 ERA and 109 strikeouts in 26 starts. In 2019, Tully split the season between Akron and Columbus, pitching to a 9–12 record and 4.44 ERA with 89 strikeouts in 144 innings pitched across 26 starts. Tully did not play in a game in 2020 due to the cancellation of the minor league season because of the COVID-19 pandemic. He spent the 2021 campaign with Akron and Columbus, working to a 6–6 record and 3.50 ERA with 97 strikeouts in 26 appearances (18 of them starts).

On April 20, 2022, Tully was selected to the 40-man roster and promoted to the major leagues for the first time as a COVID-19 replacement player. Tully made his major league debut on April 22, throwing two innings of relief against the New York Yankees, allowing 1 run on a home run by Aaron Judge. He was removed from the 40-man roster and returned to Triple-A the next day. The Guardians selected Tully's contract a second time on June 25. Tully was designated for assignment on June 27. After clearing waivers, he was outrighted to the minor leagues on June 29. The Guardians selected Tully's contract once more on July 14. Tully was designated for assignment once again on July 18. Tully cleared waivers and was outrighted to the minor leagues once more on July 20. Tully elected minor league free agency on October 13.

=== New York Yankees ===
On December 15, 2022, Tully signed a minor league contract with the New York Yankees. He made 19 starts for the Triple–A Scranton/Wilkes-Barre RailRiders, logging a 5–5 record and 5.64 ERA with 77 strikeouts across 91.0 innings of work. On August 3, 2023, Tully was released by the Yankees organization.

=== NC Dinos ===
On August 4, 2023, Tully signed with the NC Dinos of the KBO League. In 11 starts for the Dinos, Tully pitched to a 5–2 record and 2.92 ERA with 47 strikeouts across 64 2/3 innings pitched. He became a free agent following the season.

=== New York Yankees (second stint) ===
On January 10, 2024, Tully signed a minor league contract with the New York Yankees. On March 30, Tully was selected to the Yankees' active roster, but he was designated for assignment the following day without making an appearance. He cleared waivers and was sent outright to the Triple–A Scranton/Wilkes-Barre RailRiders on April 3. In 25 games (22 starts) for Scranton, Tully logged a 3–7 record and 6.41 ERA with 57 strikeouts across 99 2/3 innings pitched. He elected free agency on October 1.

=== Lexington Legends ===
On April 15, 2025, Tully signed with the Lexington Legends of the Atlantic League of Professional Baseball. In six starts for Lexington, Tully pitched to a 2–3 record and 4.26 ERA with 30 strikeouts across 32 2/3 innings pitched.

=== Caliente de Durango ===
On June 7, 2025, Tully's contract was purchased by the Caliente de Durango of the Mexican League. In 9 starts 42 innings he went 1–4 with a 5.14 ERA and 22 strikeouts.
