= Luke Maile =

American baseball player (born 1991)

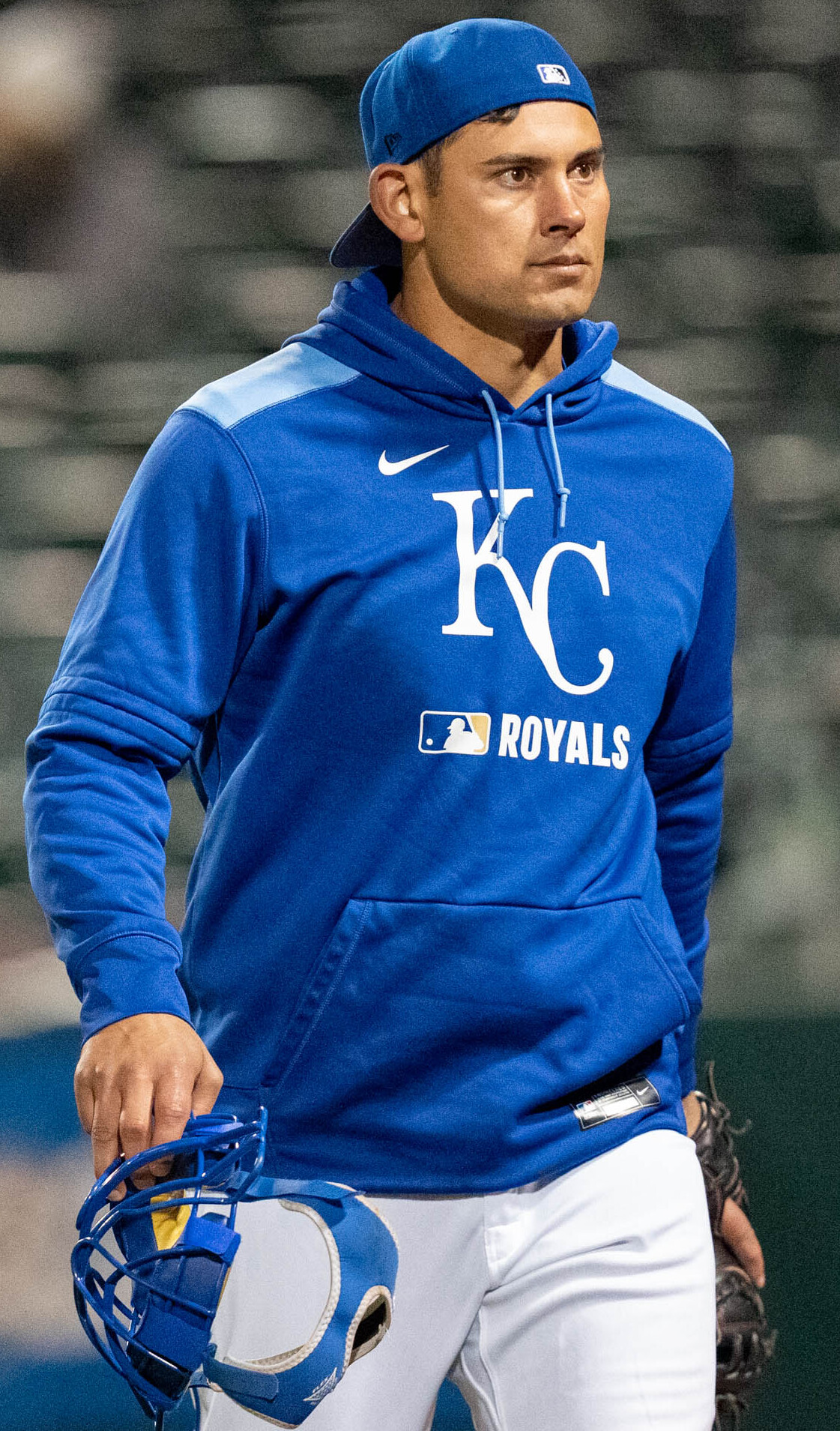
- Maile with the Omaha Storm Chasers in 2025

Free agent
- Catcher
- Born: February 6, 1991 (age 35); Edgewood, Kentucky, U.S.
- Bats: Right Throws: Right

MLB debut
- September 1, 2015, for the Tampa Bay Rays

MLB statistics (through 2026 season)
- Batting average: .208
- Home runs: 23
- Runs batted in: 124
- Stats at Baseball Reference

Teams
- Tampa Bay Rays (2015–2016); Toronto Blue Jays (2017–2019); Milwaukee Brewers (2021); Cleveland Guardians (2022); Cincinnati Reds (2023–2024); Kansas City Royals (2025–2026)

Luke Richard Maile (born February 6, 1991) is an American professional baseball catcher who is a free agent. He has played in Major League Baseball (MLB) for the Tampa Bay Rays, Toronto Blue Jays, Milwaukee Brewers, Cleveland Guardians, Cincinnati Reds, and Kansas City Royals. Before his professional career, Maile played baseball for Covington Catholic High School and the University of Kentucky.

== Amateur career ==
Maile attended Covington Catholic High School in Park Hills, Kentucky. While there, he set school records for batting average, on-base percentage, hits, walks, runs scored, runs batted in (RBIs), doubles, and triples. Maile was named The Cincinnati Enquirer's Player of the Year three times and was named Kentucky's Mr. Baseball in his senior year. He graduated in 2009.

The Boston Red Sox selected Maile in the 43rd round of the 2009 Major League Baseball draft, but he did not sign as he believed they did not offer enough money. Instead, Maile chose to enroll at the University of Kentucky, playing college baseball for the Kentucky Wildcats. In 2011, he played in three collegiate summer baseball games for the Cotuit Kettleers of the Cape Cod Baseball League. In 2012, his junior year, Maile won the Southeastern Conference (SEC) Player of the Week Award twice, was an All-SEC Second Team member, and was a semifinalist for the Golden Spikes Award and the Dick Howser Trophy. That season, he hit .319 with 12 home runs and 9 stolen bases in 62 games.

== Professional career ==
=== Tampa Bay Rays ===
The Tampa Bay Rays selected Maile in the eighth round, with the 272nd overall selection of the 2012 Major League Baseball draft. He was assigned to the Low-A Hudson Valley Renegades for the rest of 2012, appearing in 61 games and batting .278 with three home runs and 41 RBI. In 2013, Maile played in 95 games for the Single-A Bowling Green Hot Rods. He finished the year with a .283 batting average, four home runs, and 49 RBI. That autumn, he played for the Salt River Rafters of the Arizona Fall League.

In 2014, Maile played for the Montgomery Biscuits of the Double-A Southern League. The Rays promoted him to the Durham Bulls of the Triple-A International League at the end of August, but he did not appear in any games for the Bulls in 2014. In 97 games for Montgomery, Maile hit .268 with five home runs and 37 RBI. Maile played for the Bulls in 2015, hitting .207 in 89 games, and was promoted to the major leagues on September 1. He appeared in 15 games for the Rays in 2015 and hit .171 with two RBI.

Maile split time between Durham and Tampa Bay in 2016. He played in 58 games for the Bulls, hitting .242 with two home runs and 12 RBI. With the Rays, he appeared in 42 games with a .227 batting average, three home runs, and 15 RBI. The Rays designated Maile for assignment on April 2, 2017.

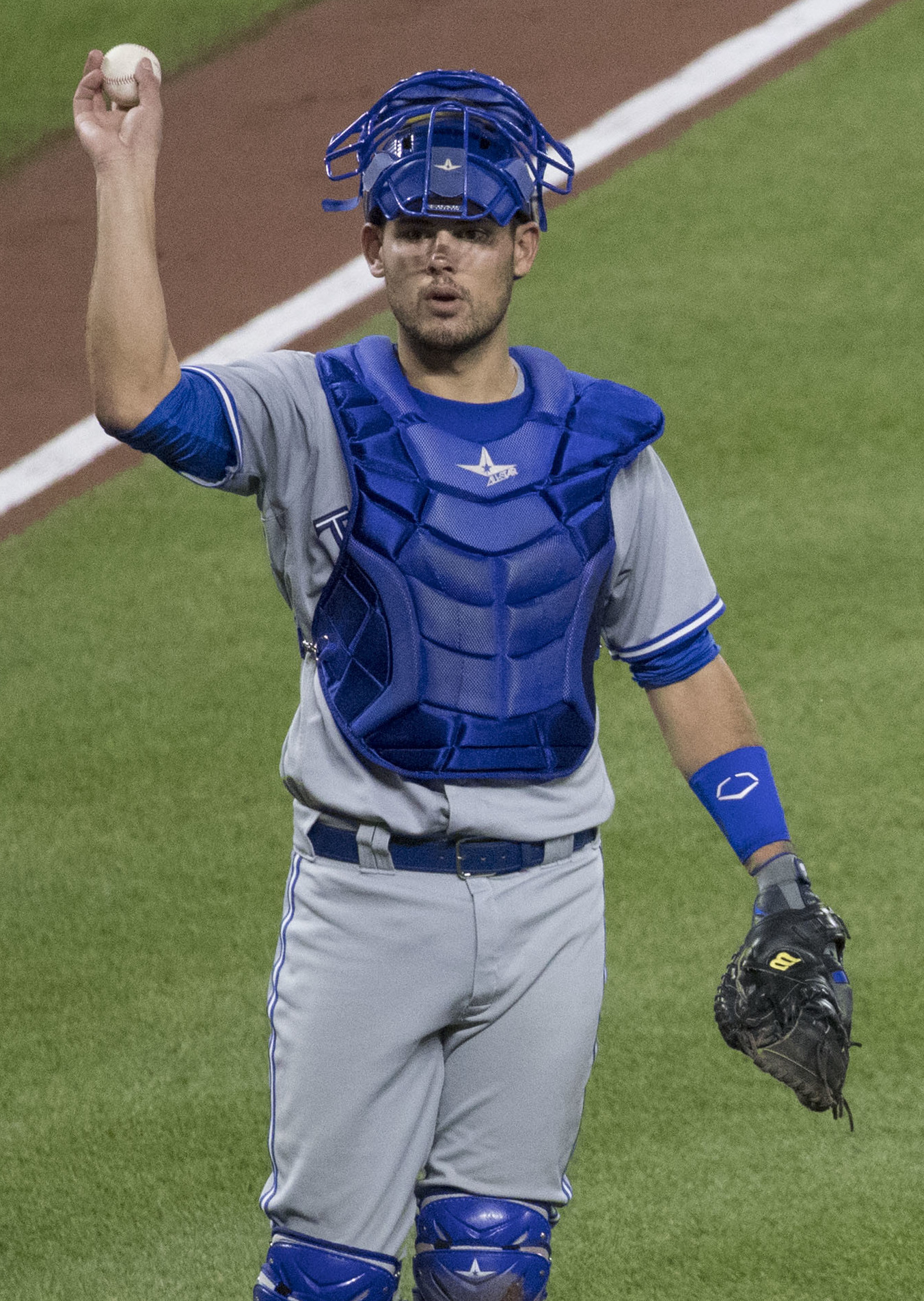
Maile with the Blue Jays in 2017

=== Toronto Blue Jays ===
The Toronto Blue Jays claimed Maile off waivers on April 6, 2017. On April 28, Maile was recalled from the Triple-A Buffalo Bisons after Jarrod Saltalamacchia was designated for assignment. Maile was placed on the disabled list on July 4 with knee inflammation. An MRI later that day determined he had a torn meniscus. He was activated from the disabled list on September 1. For the 2017 season, Maile hit .146 with two home runs in 46 games.

Maile served as the backup catcher for the 2018 season. He hit .248 with three home runs and 27 RBI. Maile appeared in only 44 games in 2019 due to an oblique injury, hitting .151 with two home runs. He was non-tendered on December 2 and became a free agent.

=== Pittsburgh Pirates ===
On December 16, 2019, Maile signed with the Pittsburgh Pirates. On July 18, 2020, the team announced that Maile would undergo season ending finger surgery after being hit by a pitch in an exhibition game. On October 30, 2020, Maile was outrighted off of the 40-man roster.

=== Milwaukee Brewers ===
Maile signed a one-year contract with the Milwaukee Brewers on December 8, 2020. On April 30, 2021, he made his Brewers debut, coming in as a pinch runner and staying in the game as the catcher. Maile played in 15 games for the Brewers, hitting .300 with three RBIs. On November 5, Maile elected free agency after rejecting an outright assignment to Triple-A.

=== Cleveland Guardians ===
Maile signed a one-year contract with the Cleveland Guardians on March 14, 2022. Backing up Austin Hedges, Maile hit .221 with three home runs in 76 games. He got his first postseason hit, a single in a 5–1 loss to the New York Yankees in Game 5 of the American League Division Series. The Guardians did not tender Maile a contract for 2023 by the non-tender deadline of November 18, so he became a free agent.

=== Cincinnati Reds ===
On November 20, 2022, Maile signed a one-year contract with the Cincinnati Reds. In 74 games for Cincinnati, he hit .235/.308/.391 with a career-high six home runs and 25 RBI.

On October 19, 2023, Maile re-signed with the Reds on a one-year. $3.5 million contract for the 2024 season. In 53 appearances for Cincinnati, he slashed .178/.268/.252 with two home runs, eight RBI, and two stolen bases. The Reds declined Maile's 2025 option on November 1, 2024, making him a free agent.

=== Kansas City Royals ===
On February 16, 2025, Maile signed a minor league contract with the Kansas City Royals. He requested and was granted his release by the Royals on March 23, after failing to make the Opening Day roster. On March 25, Maile re-signed with the Royals on a minor league contract. In 12 games for the Triple-A Omaha Storm Chasers, he hit .286 with one home run and 10 RBI. On May 2, the Royals selected Maile's contract, adding him to their active roster. He hit a home run in his first game with the Royals, a solo shot off Charlie Morton of the Baltimore Orioles on May 4. In three games for Kansas City, Maile went 3-for-8 (.375) with one home run, one RBI, and one walk. On May 19, Maile was designated for assignment by the Royals. He cleared waivers and was sent outright to Triple-A Omaha on May 24. On July 4, the Royals added Maile back to their active roster. He made 25 appearances for Kansas City, batting .244/.346/.356 with one home run, six RBI, and one stolen base.

On February 6, 2026, Maile re-signed with the Royals organization on a minor league contract. In 28 appearances for Triple-A Omaha, he batted .202/.324/.303 with two home runs and nine RBI. On July 2, the Royals selected Maile's contract, adding him to their active roster.

== Personal life ==
Maile was married on November 1, 2014, to Paige Maile, née Archinal. His father, Rich Maile, played football at the University of Kentucky and University of Dayton. His grandfather Dick Maile was an All-American basketball player for the LSU Tigers and was a late pick in the 1965 NBA draft.

Maile's mother is Laurie Maile, and he has two brothers and two sisters. He is the first cousin of Michael Mayer, who is currently a tight end for the Las Vegas Raiders.

Maile played golf and basketball in high school.
