= Rouglas Odor =

Venezuelan baseball coach (born 1968)

Cleveland Guardians – No. 53
- Third base coach / Infielder
- Born: January 26, 1968 (age 58); Maracaibo, Venezuela
- Bats: Right Throws: Right
- Stats at Baseball Reference

Teams
- Cleveland Guardians (2024–present)

Rouglas José Odor (born January 26, 1968) is a Venezuelan professional baseball coach and former infielder. Odor is the third base and infield coach for the Cleveland Guardians of Major League Baseball (MLB).

== Career ==
Odor attended the University of New Orleans, and played college baseball for the New Orleans Privateers. In 1987, he played collegiate summer baseball with the Chatham A's of the Cape Cod Baseball League. He began his professional career in the Cleveland Indians organization for the Burlington Indians in 1988. He played for eight seasons in Minor League Baseball for the Indians and Milwaukee Brewers organizations, and in the Texas-Louisiana League in 1995.

From 1996 to 2001, Odor was the field coordinator of Cleveland's Venezuelan academy. He managed the Burlington Indians from 2001 through 2004, the Mahoning Valley Scrappers in 2005 and 2006 and the GCL Indians in 2007 and 2008. He then became a hitting coach with the Kinston Indians for two season before moving up the same role with the Akron RubberDucks in 2011. He became the hitting coach of the Columbus Clippers in 2015. Odor joined the Venezuelan national baseball team as a coach in the 2017 World Baseball Classic. In the Venezuelan Professional Baseball League, he managed the Caribes de Anzoátegui during the 2017-18 season.

In 2018, Odor managed the Lynchburg Hillcats. The next year, he became the manager of the RubberDucks. He won his 245th game for the RubberDucks in June 2023, setting a new franchise record.

Cleveland promoted Odor to the major league coaching staff as their third base coach and infield coach before the 2024 season.

== Personal life ==
Odor is the uncle of brothers Rougned Odor, who played 10 seasons in MLB, and Rougned J. Odor, who played in the foreign minor leagues in the Texas Rangers organization for three seasons.
