= Arizona Complex League Guardians =

- (1967–1975, 1988–1990, 2006–present); Goodyear, Arizona; Gulf Coast League Indians (before 2009) Arizona League Indians (2009–2022)

Minor league affiliations
- Class: Rookie
- League: Arizona Complex League
- Division: Central Division
- Previous leagues: Arizona League (2009–2020); Gulf Coast League (1967–1975, 1988–1990, 2006–2008)

Major league affiliations
- Team: Cleveland Guardians

Minor league titles
- League titles (1): 2014
- Division titles (2): 2014; 2021
- First-half titles (1): 2016

Team data
- Name: ACL Guardians (2022–present)
- Previous names: ACL Indians (2021); AZL Indians Blue & Red (2019); AZL Indians 1 & 2 (2018); AZL Indians (2009–2017); GCL Indians (1967–1975, 1988–1990, 2006–2008)
- Ballpark: Goodyear Ballpark
- Previous parks: Chain of Lakes Park (2006–2008)
- Owner/ Operator: Cleveland Guardians
- Manager: Juan De La Cruz

The Arizona Complex League Guardians are a Rookie-level affiliate of the Cleveland Guardians, competing in the Arizona Complex League of Minor League Baseball. The team plays its home games at Goodyear Ballpark in Goodyear, Arizona. The team is composed mainly of players who are in their first year of professional baseball either as draftees or non-drafted free agents from the United States, Canada, Dominican Republic, Venezuela, and other countries.

== History ==
The Cleveland Indians previously fielded a Rookie-level team in the Gulf Coast League (GCL) during three tenures (1967–1975, 1988–1990, and 2006–2008) known as the Gulf Coast League Indians. The team played at Chain of Lakes Park in Winter Haven, Florida, during 2006–2008. Notable players for the GCL Indians include Jeff Newman in 1970; Newman went on to play in Major League Baseball from 1976 to 1984, and was one of three managers for the 1986 Oakland Athletics.

In 2009, when the major-league Indians moved their spring training from Florida to Arizona, the Rookie-level team moved to the Arizona League (AZL), becoming the Arizona League Indians. The team has competed in Arizona since then. In 2018 and 2019, the team fielded two squads in the league, differentiated by suffixes (1 and 2, or Blue and Red). Prior to the 2021 season, the Arizona League was renamed as the Arizona Complex League (ACL). Following the rebranding of the Cleveland Indians to the "Cleveland Guardians" prior to the 2022 season, the organization's domestic complex team was renamed the "ACL Guardians."

== Rosters ==
Arizona Complex League Guardians roster
Players	Coaches/Other
Pitchers: -- Harrison Bodendorf; -- Wes Burton; -- Justin Campbell; -- Evan Chrest; -- José Contreras; 58 Yatner Crisostomo; -- Ryan DeSanto; 41 Miguel Flores; -- Luke House; -- Will Hynes; -- Nelson Keljo; 64 Diovel Mariano; -- Derek Munoz; 40 Manuel Osorio; 39 Santiago Peraza; 47 Erigaldi Perez; 65 Joelvis Perez; 37 José Ramirez; 45 Renil Ramos; 30 Jacob Remily; -- Aaron Savary; -- Cameron Sullivan; 55 Javi Torres; Catchers: 16 Pedro Dalmagro; 32 Reiner Herrera; 8 Victor Izturis; 29 David Leon; Infielders: 11 Jhorvic Abreus; 23 Luis De La Cruz; 7 Jonathan Martinez; 6 Gabriel Rodriguez; 1 Johan Rodriguez; Outfielders: 34 Robert Arias; 15 Yeiferth Castillo; -- Jace LaViolette; 46 Estivel Morillo; 28 Heribert Silva	Manager: 9 Juan De La Cruz; Coaches: -- Brandon League (pitching); -- Ronald Parra (pitching); 4 Jason Rose (hitting); -- Mike Snow (hitting); 2 Chaz Verduzco (bench); 7-day injured list; * On Cleveland Guardians 40-man roster; ~ Development list; # Rehab assignment; ∞ Reserve list; ‡ Restricted list; § Suspended list; † Temporarily inactive list; Roster updated March 27, 2026; Transactions; → More rosters: MiLB • Arizona Complex League; → Cleveland Guardians minor league players

== Season-by-season ==
Year	Record	Finish	Manager	Playoffs
GCL Indians
1967	30–29	2nd	Gordon Seyfried	No playoffs until 1983
1968	33–27	3rd	Ken Aspromonte	
1969	30–23	2nd	Joe Lutz	
1970	34–26	3rd	Joe Lutz	
1971	28–24	3rd	Len Johnston	
1972	34–26	3rd	Pinky May	
1973	32–24	2nd	Len Johnston	
1974	16–36	8th	Wilfredo Calviño	
1975	19–33	6th	Tony Pacheco	
1988	38–25	5th	Billy Williams	
1989	34–29	7th	Mike Bucci	
1990	23–40	13th	Dean Treanor	
2006	21–29	11th	Chris Tremie	
2007	28–31	8th	Rouglas Odor	
2008	27–29	11th	Rouglas Odor	

Year	Record	Finish	Manager	Playoffs
AZL Indians
2009	24–32	8th (t)	Ted Kubiak	
2010	21–35	10th	Chris Tremie	
2011	30–26	5th	Anthony Medrano	
2012	31–25	6th (t)	Anthony Medrano	
2013	28–28	7th	Anthony Medrano	Lost in 1st round vs. AZL Rangers (1 game to 0)
2014	37–16	1st	Anthony Medrano	League Champs vs. AZL Giants (1 game to 0); Won in semifinals vs. AZL Rangers (1 game to 0)
2015	23–33	12th (t)	Anthony Medrano	
