= 2022 Minnesota Twins season =

2022 Minnesota Twins
- League: American League
- Division: Central
- Ballpark: Target Field
- City: Minneapolis, Minnesota
- Record: 78–84 (.481)
- Divisional place: 3rd
- Owners: Jim Pohlad
- President: Dave St. Peter
- President of baseball operations: Derek Falvey
- General manager: Thad Levine
- Managers: Rocco Baldelli
- Television: Bally Sports North (Dick Bremer, Justin Morneau) (Marney Gellner) (Audra Martin)
- Radio: WCCO (Cory Provus, Dan Gladden)
- Stats: ESPN.com; Baseball Reference

The 2022 Minnesota Twins season was the 62nd season for the Minnesota Twins franchise in the Twin Cities of Minnesota, their 13th season at Target Field and the 122nd overall in the American League. The team finished third in the American League Central with a 78–84 record.

On December 2, 2021, Commissioner Rob Manfred announced a lockout of players, following expiration of the collective bargaining agreement (CBA) between the league and the Major League Baseball Players Association (MLBPA). On March 10, 2022, MLB and the MLBPA agreed to a new collective bargaining agreement, thus ending the lockout. Opening Day was played on April 7. Although MLB previously announced that several series would be cancelled due to the lockout, the agreement provides for a 162-game season, with originally canceled games to be made up via doubleheaders.

After having a 62–55 record, the Twins would collapse. After dropping their lead in the AL Central, they went 16–29 the rest of the way, having another losing season and eliminating them from playoff contention for the second consecutive season.

== Offseason ==
=== Lockout ===
The expiration of the league's collective bargaining agreement (CBA) with the Major League Baseball Players Association occurred on December 1, 2021, with no new agreement in place. As a result, the team owners voted unanimously to lockout the players stopping all free agency and trades.

The parties came to an agreement on a new CBA on March 10, 2022.

=== Rule changes ===
Pursuant to the new CBA, several new rules were instituted for the 2022 season. The National League will adopt the designated hitter full-time, a draft lottery will be implemented, the postseason will expand from ten teams to twelve, and advertising patches will appear on player uniforms and helmets for the first time.

== Roster ==
2022 Minnesota Twins
Roster
Pitchers: 66 Jorge Alcalá; 17 Chris Archer; 37 Dylan Bundy; 99 Yennier Canó; 45 Jharel Cotton; 53 Danny Coulombe; 21 Austin Davis; 21 Tyler Duffey; 59 Jhoan Durán; 52 Michael Fulmer; 51 Chi Chi Gonzalez; 54 Sonny Gray; 44 Ian Hamilton; 70 Ronny Henríquez; 65 Griffin Jax; 48 Jorge López; 51 Tyler Mahle; 58 Trevor Megill; 49 Juan Minaya; 71 Jovani Morán; 16 Bailey Ober; 20 Chris Paddack; 12 Emilio Pagán; 32 Dereck Rodríguez; 50 Jhon Romero; 41 Joe Ryan; 43 Aaron Sanchez; 77 Cole Sands; 31 Devin Smeltzer; 38 Joe Smith; 61 Cody Stashak; 56 Caleb Thielbar; 48 Tyler Thornburg; 49 Louie Varland; 74 Josh Winder; 78 Simeon Woods Richardson	Catchers: 60 José Godoy; 90 Caleb Hamilton; 27 Ryan Jeffers; 39 Sandy León; 24 Gary Sánchez; Infielders: 2 Luis Arráez; 4 Carlos Correa; 23 Royce Lewis; 64 José Miranda; 87 Jermaine Palacios; 11 Jorge Polanco; 22 Miguel Sanó; 15 Gio Urshela	Outfielders: 9 Tim Beckham; 25 Byron Buxton; 8 Jake Cave; 67 Gilberto Celestino; 55 Mark Contreras; 30 Kyle Garlick; 1 Nick Gordon; 0 Billy Hamilton; 26 Max Kepler; 19 Alex Kirilloff; 13 Trevor Larnach; 38 Matt Wallner	Manager: 5 Rocco Baldelli; Coaches: 35 Hank Conger (first base/catching); 75 Nate Dammann (quality control); 46 Tony Diaz (assistant bench); 63 Rudy Hernandez (hitting); 88 Pete Maki (pitching); 98 Connor Olson (bullpen catcher); 79 David Popkins (hitting); 91 Luis Ramirez (assistant pitching); -- Colby Suggs (bullpen); 33 Jayce Tingler (bench); 40 Tommy Watkins (third base)

== Regular season ==
=== American League Central ===
AL Central
Team	W	L	Pct.	GB	Home	Road
Cleveland Guardians	92	70	.568	—	46‍–‍35	46‍–‍35
Chicago White Sox	81	81	.500	11	37‍–‍44	44‍–‍37
Minnesota Twins	78	84	.481	14	46‍–‍35	32‍–‍49
Detroit Tigers	66	96	.407	26	36‍–‍46	30‍–‍50
Kansas City Royals	65	97	.401	27	39‍–‍42	26‍–‍55

=== American League Wild Card ===
Division leaders
Team	W	L	Pct.
Houston Astros	106	56	.654
New York Yankees	99	63	.611
Cleveland Guardians	92	70	.568

Wild Card teams (Top 3 teams qualify for postseason)
Team	W	L	Pct.	GB
Toronto Blue Jays	92	70	.568	+6
Seattle Mariners	90	72	.556	+4
Tampa Bay Rays	86	76	.531	—
Baltimore Orioles	83	79	.512	3
Chicago White Sox	81	81	.500	5
Minnesota Twins	78	84	.481	8
Boston Red Sox	78	84	.481	8
Los Angeles Angels	73	89	.451	13
Texas Rangers	68	94	.420	18
Detroit Tigers	66	96	.407	20
Kansas City Royals	65	97	.401	21
Oakland Athletics	60	102	.370	26

=== Records vs. AL opponents ===
2022 American League record Source: MLB Standings Grid – 2022
Team	BAL	BOS	CWS	CLE	DET	HOU	KC	LAA	MIN	NYY	OAK	SEA	TB	TEX	TOR	NL
Baltimore	—	9–10	5–2	3–3	1–5	4–3	4–3	6–1	3–4	7–12	3–4	2–4	9–10	6–0	9–10	12–8
Boston	10–9	—	2–4	5–2	5–1	4–2	3–4	4–3	3–4	6–13	5–1	6–1	7–12	6–1	3–16	9–11
Chicago	2–5	4–2	—	7–12	12–7	3–4	9–10	3–4	9–10	3–4	5–2	4–2	4–2	3–4	2–4	11–9
Cleveland	3–3	2–5	12–7	—	10–9	3–4	12–7	3–4	13–6	1–5	6–1	1–6	4–2	5–1	5–2	12–8
Detroit	5–1	1–5	7–12	9–10	—	0–7	10–9	3–3	8–11	1–5	2–5	1–6	2–5	4–3	2–5	11–9
Houston	3–4	2–4	4–3	4–3	7–0	—	5–2	13–6	6–0	5–2	12–7	12–7	5–1	14–5	2–4	12–8
Kansas City	3–4	4–3	10–9	7–12	9–10	2–5	—	3–3	7–12	1–6	3–3	2–4	3–4	2–4	2–5	7–13
Los Angeles	1–6	3–4	4–3	4–3	3–3	6–13	3–3	—	4–2	2–4	12–7	10–9	2–5	9–10	3–4	7–13
Minnesota	4–3	4–3	10–9	6–13	11–8	0–6	12–7	2–4	—	2–5	5–1	4–3	4–2	2–5	4–3	8–12
New York	12–7	13–6	4–3	5–1	5–1	2–5	6–1	4–2	5–2	—	5–2	2–4	11–8	4–3	11–8	10–10
Oakland	4–3	1–5	2–5	1–6	5–2	7–12	3–3	7–12	1–5	2–5	—	8–11	3–4	8–11	3–3	5–15
Seattle	4–2	1–6	2–4	6–1	6–1	7–12	4–2	9–10	3–4	4–2	11–8	—	2–5	14–5	5–2	12–8
Tampa Bay	10–9	12–7	2–4	2–4	5–2	1–5	4–3	5–2	2–4	8–11	4–3	5–2	—	4–3	10–9	12–8
Texas	0–6	1–6	4–3	1–5	3–4	5–14	4–2	10–9	5–2	3–4	11–8	5–14	3–4	—	2–4	11–9
Toronto	10–9	16–3	4–2	2–5	5–2	4–2	5–2	4–3	3–4	8–11	3–3	2–5	9–10	4–2	—	13–7

Updated with the results of all games through October 5, 2022.

== Game log ==
Legend
	Twins win
	Twins loss
	Postponement
**Bold**	Twins team member

2022 Game Log: 78−84 (Home: 47–34; Away: 31–50)
April: 12–9 (Home: 8–4; Away: 4–5)

#	Date	Opponent	Score	Win	Loss	Save	Attendance	Record	Streak
1	April 8	Mariners	1–2	Ray (1–0)	**Ryan** (0–1)	Steckenrider (1)	35,462	0–1	L1
2	April 9	Mariners	3–4	Muñoz (1–0)	**Duffey** (0–1)	Castillo (1)	20,867	0–2	L2
3	April 10	Mariners	10–4	**Ober** (1–0)	Gonzales (0–1)	–	17,018	1–2	W1
4	April 11	Mariners	4–0	**Bundy** (1–0)	Flexen (0–1)	–	12,932	2–2	W2
5	April 12	Dodgers	2–7	Hudson (1–0)	**Pagán** (0–1)	–	16,732	2–3	L1
6	April 13	Dodgers	0–7	Kershaw (1–0)	**Paddack** (0–1)	–	17,101	2–4	L2
7	April 15	@ Red Sox	8–4	**Ryan** (1–1)	Pivetta (0–2)	–	36,266	3–4	W1
8	April 16	@ Red Sox	0–4	Houck (1–0)	**Gray** (0–1)	–	34,990	3–5	L1
9	April 17	@ Red Sox	1–8	Strahm (1–0)	**Ober** (1–1)	–	28,858	3–6	L2
10	April 18	@ Red Sox	8–3	**Bundy** (2–0)	Hill (0–1)	–	32,514	4–6	W1
11	April 19	@ Royals	3–4	Garrett (1–0)	**Duffey** (0–2)	Staumont (2)	10,303	4–7	L1
12	April 20	@ Royals	0–2	Lynch (1–1)	**Paddack** (0–2)	Barlow (1)	8,969	4–8	L2
13	April 21	@ Royals	1–0	**Ryan** (2–1)	Greinke (0–1)	**Pagán** (1)	15,540	5–8	W1
14	April 22	White Sox	2–1	**Duffey** (1–2)	Graveman (0–1)	**Pagán** (2)	14,257	6–8	W2
15	April 23	White Sox	9–2	**Bundy** (3–0)	Velasquez (0–2)	–	16,686	7–8	W3
16	April 24	White Sox	6–4 (10)	**Smith** (1–0)	Hendriks (0–2)	–	16,197	8–8	W4
17	April 26	Tigers	5–4	**Jax** (1–0)	Soto (1–1)	–	11,803	9–8	W5
18	April 27	Tigers	5–0	**Ryan** (3–1)	Pineda (1–1)	–	11,829	10–8	W6
19	April 28	Tigers	7–1	**Stashak** (1–0)	Skubal (1–2)	**Jax** (1)	19,365	11–8	W7
20	April 29	@ Rays	1–6	Kluber (1–1)	**Bundy** (3–1)	–	9,928	11–9	L1
21	April 30	@ Rays	9–1	**Stashak** (2–0)	McClanahan (1–2)	–	18,846	12–9	W1

May: 18–12 (Home: 9–7; Away: 9–5)

#	Date	Opponent	Score	Win	Loss	Save	Attendance	Record	Streak
22	May 1	@ Rays	9–3	**Winder** (1–0)	Fleming (2–3)	–	14,830	13–9	W2
23	May 2	@ Orioles	2–1	**Paddack** (1–2)	Baker (1–1)	**Durán** (1)	7,427	14–9	W3
24	May 3	@ Orioles	7–2	**Thielbar** (1–0)	Krehbiel (1–3)	–	6,678	15–9	W4
25	May 4	@ Orioles	4–9	Pérez (1–0)	**Bundy** (3–2)	–	7,466	15–10	L1
26	May 5	@ Orioles	3–5	López (3–1)	**Durán** (0–1)	–	8,652	15–11	L2
27	May 6	Athletics	2–1	**Winder** (2–0)	Logue (1–1)	**Pagán** (3)	17,509	16–11	W1
28	May 7	Athletics	1–0	**Jax** (2–0)	Kaprielian (0–2)	**Durán** (2)	22,272	17–11	W2
29	May 8	Athletics	4–3	**Stashak** (3–0)	Jefferies (1–5)	**Pagán** (4)	14,295	18–11	W3
30	May 10	Astros	0–5	Verlander (4–1)	**Ryan** (3–2)	–	16,156	18–12	L1
—	May 11	Astros	SUSP., RAIN; resuming May 12						
31	May 12 (1)	Astros	3–11	Abreu (2–0)	**Archer** (0–1)	–	see 2nd game	18–13	L2
32	May 12 (2)	Astros	0–5	García (3–1)	**Winder** (2–1)	–	16,918	18–14	L3
33	May 13	Guardians	12–8	**Jax** (3–0)	Civale (1–3)	–	18,711	19–14	W1
34	May 14	Guardians	2–3 (10)	Sandlin (3–1)	**Cotton** (0–1)	Clase (7)	22,939	19–15	L1
35	May 15	Guardians	3–1	**Ryan** (4–2)	McKenzie (2–3)	**Pagán** (5)	19,850	20–15	W1
36	May 16	@ Athletics	3–1	**Cano** (1–0)	Logue (2–2)	**Duffey** (1)	3,138	21–15	W2
37	May 17	@ Athletics	2–5	Jackson (1–1)	**Winder** (2–2)	Jiménez (7)	3,640	21–16	L1
38	May 18	@ Athletics	14–4	**Gray** (1–1)	Jefferies (1–7)	–	7,106	22–16	W1
39	May 20	@ Royals	6–4	**Smeltzer** (1–0)	Lynch (2–3)	**Pagán** (6)	25,337	23–16	W2
40	May 21	@ Royals	9–2	**Ryan** (5–2)	Keller (1–4)	–	17,893	24–16	W3
41	May 22	@ Royals	7–6	**Duffey** (2–2)	Staumont (1–1)	**Durán** (3)	15,482	25–16	W4
42	May 23	Tigers	5–4	**Pagán** (1–1)	Chafin (0–1)	–	16,361	26–16	W5
43	May 24	Tigers	2–0	**Gray** (2–1)	Brieske (0–4)	**Durán** (4)	17,882	27–16	W6
44	May 25	Tigers	2–4 (10)	Lange (1–1)	**Megill** (0–1)	Chafin (1)	20,375	27–17	L1
45	May 26	Royals	2–3	Staumont (2–1)	**Duffey** (2–3)	Barlow (5)	17,657	27–18	L2
46	May 27	Royals	10–7	**Megill** (1–1)	Keller (1–5)	**Pagán** (7)	21,841	28–18	W1
47	May 28	Royals	3–7	Singer (2–0)	**Archer** (0–2)	–	22,249	28–19	L1
48	May 29	Royals	7–3	**Gray** (3–1)	Greinke (0–4)	–	27,195	29–19	W1
49	May 30	@ Tigers	5–7	Jiménez (2–0)	**Smith** (1–1)	Soto (9)	15,191	29–20	L1
50	May 31 (1)	@ Tigers	8–2	**Smeltzer** (2–0)	García (0–1)	–	11,756	30–20	W1
51	May 31 (2)	@ Tigers	0–4	Peralta (2–0)	**Sands** (0–1)	–	12,122	30–21	L1

June: 13–15 (Home: 6–6; Away: 7–9)

#	Date	Opponent	Score	Win	Loss	Save	Attendance	Record	Streak
52	June 1	@ Tigers	0–5	Skubal (4–2)	**Ober** (1–2)	–	13,211	30–22	L2
53	June 2	@ Tigers	2–3	Lange (3–1)	**Pagán** (1–2)	Soto (10)	17,972	30–23	L3
54	June 3	@ Blue Jays	9–3	**Cotton** (1–1)	Kikuchi (2–2)	–	27,753	31–23	W1
55	June 4	@ Blue Jays	3–12	Berríos (4–2)	**Bundy** (3–3)	–	36,987	31–24	L1
56	June 5	@ Blue Jays	8–6	**Cotton** (2–1)	Gausman (5–4)	**Morán** (1)	34,088	32–24	W1
57	June 7	Yankees	4–10	Luetge (2–2)	**Sands** (0–2)	–	27,643	32–25	L1
58	June 8	Yankees	8–1	**Archer** (1–2)	Cortés Jr (5–2)	–	22,286	33–25	W1
59	June 9	Yankees	7–10	Castro (3–0)	**Durán** (0–2)	Holmes (9)	26,646	33–26	L1
60	June 10	Rays	9–4	**Smeltzer** (3–0)	Rasmussen (5–3)	–	23,761	34–26	W1
61	June 11	Rays	6–5	**Megill** (2–1)	Baz (0–1)	**Pagán** (8)	22,741	35–26	W2
62	June 12	Rays	0–6	Springs (3–2)	**Sands** (0–3)	–	25,350	35–27	L1
63	June 13	@ Mariners	3–2	**Thielbar** (2–0)	Flexen (2–8)	**Pagán** (9)	12,749	36–27	W1
64	June 14	@ Mariners	0–5	Gilbert (7–2)	**Ryan** (5–3)	–	13,019	36–28	L1
65	June 15	@ Mariners	5–0	**Jax** (4–0)	Gonzales (3–7)	–	15,329	37–28	W1
66	June 17	@ Diamondbacks	2–7	Bumgarner (3–6)	**Smeltzer** (3–1)	–	26,351	37–29	L1
67	June 18	@ Diamondbacks	11–1	**Bundy** (4–3)	Weaver (1–1)	–	24,338	38–29	W1
68	June 19	@ Diamondbacks	1–7	Kelly (6–4)	**Archer** (1–3)	–	30,690	38–30	L1
69	June 21	Guardians	5–6 (10)	Stephan (3–2)	**Jax** (4–1)	Clase (16)	22,341	38–31	L2
70	June 22	Guardians	10–11	Hentges (1–0)	**Jax** (4–2)	Clase (17)	25,604	38–32	L3
71	June 23	Guardians	1–0	**Smeltzer** (4–1)	Plesac (2–5)	**Thielbar** (1)	24,989	39–32	W1
72	June 24	Rockies	0–1	Márquez (4–5)	**Bundy** (4–4)	Bard (15)	24,463	39–33	L1
73	June 25	Rockies	6–0	**Archer** (2–3)	Senzatela (3–4)	–	24,578	40–33	W1
74	June 26	Rockies	6–3	**Ryan** (6–3)	Feltner (1–3)	**Durán** (5)	28,048	41–33	W2
75	June 27	@ Guardians	11–1	**Gray** (4–1)	McKenzie (4–6)	—	12,554	42–33	W3
76	June 28 (1)	@ Guardians	2–3	Hentges (2–0)	**Pagán** (1–3)	Clase (18)	12,442	42–34	L1
77	June 28 (2)	@ Guardians	6–0	**Winder** (3–2)	Pilkington (1–1)	–	12,145	43–34	W1
78	June 29	@ Guardians	6–7 (10)	Morgan (4–2)	**Cotton** (2–2)	–	12,840	43–35	L1
79	June 30	@ Guardians	3–5	Clase (2–2)	**Thornburg** (0–1)	–	17,066	43–36	L2

July: 10–12 (Home: 4–4; Away: 6–8)

#	Date	Opponent	Score	Win	Loss	Save	Attendance	Record	Streak
80	July 1	Orioles	3–2	**Minaya** (1–0)	López (3–4)	–	25,540	44–36	W1
81	July 2	Orioles	4–3	**Pagán** (2–3)	López (3–5)	–	20,618	45–36	W2
82	July 3	Orioles	1–3	Wells (7–4)	**Smeltzer** (4–2)	Tate (2)	24,424	45–37	L1
83	July 4	@ White Sox	6–3 (10)	**Pagán** (3–3)	Kelly (0–2)	–	32,483	46–37	W1
84	July 5	@ White Sox	8–2	**Winder** (4–2)	Kopech (2–6)	–	18,566	47–37	W2
85	July 6	@ White Sox	8–9 (10)	Ruiz (1–0)	**Morán** (0–1)	–	18,393	47–38	L1
86	July 8	@ Rangers	5–6	Gray (5–4)	**Gray** (4–2)	Martin (1)	30,392	47–39	L2
87	July 9	@ Rangers	7–9	Moore (4–2)	**Durán** (0–3)	Martin (2)	35,427	47–40	L3
88	July 10	@ Rangers	6–5	**Bundy** (5–4)	Burke (4–2)	**Duffey** (2)	24,751	48–40	W1
89	July 12	Brewers	3–6	Gustave (2–0)	**Winder** (4–3)	Hader (27)	37,183	48–41	L1
90	July 13	Brewers	4–1	**Durán** (1–3)	Hader (0–3)	–	38,802	49–41	W1
91	July 14	White Sox	2–12	Cueto (4–4)	**Gray** (4–3)	–	26,907	49–42	L1
92	July 15	White Sox	2–6	Kopech (3–6)	**Pagán** (3–4)	–	27,021	49–43	L2
93	July 16	White Sox	6–3	**Bundy** (6–4)	Lynn (1–3)	**Durán** (6)	28,514	50–43	W1
94	July 17	White Sox	0–11	Cease (9–4)	**Archer** (2–4)	–	23,225	50–44	L1
ASG	July 19	AL @ NL	3–2	Valdez (1–0)	Gonsolin (0–1)	Clase (1)	52,518	N/A	N/A
95	July 23	@ Tigers	8–4	**Ryan** (7–3)	Pineda (2–6)	–	34,205	51–44	W1
96	July 24	@ Tigers	9–1	**Gray** (5–3)	García (3–3)	–	23,570	52–44	W2
97	July 26	@ Brewers	6–7	Hader (1–4)	**Duffey** (2–4)	–	28,596	52–45	L1
98	July 27	@ Brewers	4–10	Burnes (8–4)	**Archer** (2–5)	–	35,914	52–46	L2
99	July 29	@ Padres	1–10	Snell (3–5)	**Ryan** (7–4)	–	43,171	52–47	L3
100	July 30	@ Padres	7–4	**Gray** (6–3)	Musgrove (8–4)	–	39,574	53–47	W1
101	July 31	@ Padres	2–3	Manaea (6–5)	**Bundy** (6–5)	García (1)	37,336	53–48	L1

August: 14–14 (Home: 13–7; Away: 1–7)

#	Date	Opponent	Score	Win	Loss	Save	Attendance	Record	Streak
102	August 1	Tigers	5–3 (10)	**Jax** (5–2)	Lange (4–2)	–	20,231	54–48	W1
103	August 2	Tigers	3–5	Foley (1–0)	**Jax** (5–3)	Soto (20)	23,394	54–49	L1
104	August 3	Tigers	4–1	**Ryan** (8–4)	Alexander (2–5)	**López** (20)	25,044	55–49	W1
105	August 4	Blue Jays	3–9	Manoah (12–5)	**Pagán** (3–5)	–	39,030	55–50	L1
106	August 5	Blue Jays	6–5 (10)	**Fulmer** (4–4)	Romano (3–3)	–	29,593	56–50	W1
107	August 6	Blue Jays	7–3	**Megill** (3–1)	White (1–3)	–	27,471	57–50	W2
108	August 7	Blue Jays	2–3 (10)	Romano (4–3)	**Thielbar** (2–1)	–	26,155	57–51	L1
109	August 9	@ Dodgers	3–10	Urías (12–6)	**Ryan** (8–5)	–	47,874	57–52	L2
110	August 10	@ Dodgers	5–8	Price (1–0)	**Fulmer** (4–5)	–	53,432	57–53	L3
111	August 12	@ Angels	4–0	**Mahle** (6–7)	Sandoval (3–8)	–	33,459	58–53	W1
112	August 13	@ Angels	3–5 (11)	Tepera (2–2)	**Pagán** (3–6)	–	43,027	58–54	L1
113	August 14	@ Angels	2–4	Davidson (2–3)	**Archer** (2–6)	Quijada (3)	27,515	58–55	L2
114	August 15	Royals	4–2	**Ryan** (9–5)	Bubic (2–7)	**López** (21)	22,003	59–55	W1
115	August 16	Royals	9–0	**Gray** (7–3)	Greinke (4–8)	–	23,093	60–55	W2
116	August 17	Royals	4–0	**Pagán** (4–6)	Lynch (4–8)	–	23,543	61–55	W3
117	August 19	Rangers	2–1	**Bundy** (7–5)	Pérez (9–4)	**López** (22)	22,627	62–55	W4
118	August 20	Rangers	3–4 (10)	Hernández (1–0)	**Thielbar** (2–2)	–	21,781	62–56	L1
119	August 21	Rangers	0–7	Arihara (1–1)	**Ryan** (9–6)	Hearn (1)	24,802	62–57	L2
120	August 22	Rangers	1–2	Alexy (1–0)	**Gray** (7–4)	Moore (3)	18,595	62–58	L3
121	August 23	@ Astros	2–4	Verlander (16–3)	**Sanchez** (3–4)	Abreu (2)	32,639	62–59	L4
122	August 24	@ Astros	3–5	Valdez (13–4)	**Bundy** (7–6)	–	27,070	62–60	L5
123	August 25	@ Astros	3–6	García (11–8)	**Archer** (2–7)	Montero (8)	33,320	62–61	L6
124	August 26	Giants	9–0	**Ryan** (10–6)	Wood (8–11)	–	25,246	63–61	W1
125	August 27	Giants	3–2 (10)	**Durán** (2–3)	Leone (4–5)	–	27,570	64–61	W2
126	August 28	Giants	8–3	**Smeltzer** (5–2)	Junis (4–4)	–	25,285	65–61	W3
127	August 29	Red Sox	4–2	**Thielbar** (3–2)	Bello (0–4)	**López** (23)	19,581	66–61	W4
128	August 30	Red Sox	10–5	**Fulmer** (5–5)	Crawford (3–6)	–	19,909	67–61	W5
129	August 31	Red Sox	5–6	Wacha (10–1)	**Ryan** (10–7)	Barnes (4)	19,337	67–62	L1

September: 10–18 (Home: 6–6; Away: 4–12)

#	Date	Opponent	Score	Win	Loss	Save	Attendance	Record	Streak
130	September 2	@ White Sox	3–4	Hendriks (3–3)	**López** (4–7)	–	24,818	67–63	L2
131	September 3	@ White Sox	0–13	Cease (13–6)	**Mahle** (6–8)	–	31,655	67–64	L3
132	September 4	@ White Sox	5–1	**Bundy** (8–6)	Giolito (10–9)	–	32,305	68–64	W1
133	September 5	@ Yankees	2–5	Weissert (2–0)	**Megill** (3–2)	Holmes (19)	38,446	68–65	L1
—	September 6	@ Yankees	PPD, RAIN; rescheduled for Sept 7						
134	September 7 (1)	@ Yankees	4–5 (12)	Weissert (3−0)	**Megill** (3−3)	–	see 2nd game	68–66	L2
135	September 7 (2)	@ Yankees	1–7	Cole (11−7)	**Ryan** (10−8)	Luetge (2)	30,157	68–67	L3
136	September 8	@ Yankees	4–3	**Jax** (6−3)	Peralta (2−4)	**Fulmer** (3)	35,551	69–67	W1
137	September 9	Guardians	6–7	Quantrill (12–5)	**Bundy** (8–7)	Clase (32)	18,595	69–68	L1
138	September 10	Guardians	4–6	McKenzie (10–11)	**Archer** (2–8)	Clase (33)	26,073	69–69	L2
139	September 11	Guardians	1–4	Bieber (10–8)	**Winder** (4–4)	Karinchak (2)	19,016	69–70	L3
140	September 13	Royals	6–3	**Ryan** (11–8)	Bubic (2–12)	–	19,005	70–70	W1
141	September 14	Royals	4–0	**Gray** (8–4)	Greinke (4–9)	–	14,927	71–70	W2
142	September 15	Royals	3–2	**Megill** (4–3)	Lynch (4–11)	**Durán** (7)	16,595	72–70	W3
143	September 16	@ Guardians	3–4	Stephan (6–4)	**Durán** (2–4)	Clase (36)	20,669	72–71	L1
144	September 17 (1)	@ Guardians	1–5	Bieber (11−8)	**Varland** (0−1)	–	18,177	72–72	L2
145	September 17 (2)	@ Guardians	6–7 (15)	McCarty (4–2)	**Rodríguez** (0–1)	–	24,449	72–73	L3
146	September 18	@ Guardians	3–0	**Ryan** (12–8)	Morris (0–2)	**Durán** (8)	19,601	73–73	W1
147	September 19	@ Guardians	4–11	Quantrill (13–5)	**Gray** (8–5)	Hentges (1)	12,168	73–74	L1
148	September 20	@ Royals	4–5	Coleman (5–2)	**Fulmer** (5–6)	Barlow (22)	14,508	73–75	L2
149	September 21	@ Royals	2–5	Misiewicz (1–1)	**Ober** (1–3)	Barlow (23)	13,952	73–76	L3
150	September 22	@ Royals	1–4	Heasley (4–8)	**Winder** (4–5)	Keller (1)	12,951	73–77	L4
151	September 23	Angels	2–4	Ohtani (14–8)	**Varland** (0–2)	Tepera (4)	24,896	73–78	L5
152	September 24	Angels	8–4	**Jax** (7–3)	Detmers (6–6)	–	30,959	74–78	W1
153	September 25	Angels	3–10	Suárez (7–8)	**Bundy** (8–8)	–	24,133	74–79	L1
154	September 27	White Sox	4–0	**Ober** (2–3)	Lynn (7–7)	–	23,647	75–79	W1
155	September 28	White Sox	8–4	**Thielbar** (4–2)	Cueto (7–10)	–	22,332	76–79	W2
156	September 29	White Sox	3–4	López (6–4)	**Thielbar** (4–3)	Hendriks (34)	23,397	76–80	L1
157	September 30	@ Tigers	7–0	**Ryan** (13–8)	Alexander (4–11)	–	18,505	77–80	W1

October: 1–4 (Home: 0–0; Away: 1–4)

#	Date	Opponent	Score	Win	Loss	Save	Attendance	Record	Streak
158	October 1	@ Tigers	2–3	Norris (2–4)	**Henríquez** (0–1)	Chafin (2)	18,307	77–81	L1
159	October 2	@ Tigers	2–5	Lange (7–4)	**Woods-Richardson** (0–1)	Soto (30)	20,105	77–82	L2
160	October 3	@ White Sox	2–3	Cueto (8–10)	**Jax** (7–4)	Hendriks (37)	22,891	77–83	L3
161	October 4	@ White Sox	3–8	Giolito (11–9)	**Winder** (4–6)	–	24,884	77–84	L4
162	October 5	@ White Sox	10–1	**Varland** (1–2)	Martin (3–5)	**Sands** (1)	18,918	78–84	W1

== Statistics ==
=== Batting ===
(through October 5, 2022)
Players in bold are on the active roster.
Team leaders in each category are in bold.

- Indicates league leader.

Note: G = Games played; AB = At bats; R = Runs; H = Hits; 2B = Doubles; 3B = Triples; HR = Home runs; RBI = Runs batted in; SB = Stolen bases; BB = Walks; K = Strikeouts; AVG = Batting average; OBP = On Base Percentage; SLG = Slugging Percentage; TB = Total Bases

Player	G	AB	R	H	2B	3B	HR	RBI	SB	BB	K	AVG	OBP	SLG	TB
**Luis Arráez**	**144**	**547**	**88**	**173**	**31**	1	8	49	4	50	43	**.316***	**.375**	.420	230
Tim Beckham	12	25	1	2	0	0	0	1	0	0	9	.080	.080	.080	2
Byron Buxton	92	340	61	76	13	3	**28**	51	**6**	34	116	.224	.306	.526	179
**Jake Cave**	54	164	17	35	7	3	5	20	2	11	49	.213	.260	.384	63
**Gilberto Celestino**	122	311	30	74	12	1	2	24	4	32	77	.238	.313	.302	94
Mark Contreras	28	58	9	7	1	0	3	6	1	1	21	.121	.148	.293	17
**Carlos Correa**	136	522	70	152	24	1	22	64	0	61	121	.291	.366	**.467**	**244**
**Kyle Garlick**	66	150	23	35	3	0	9	18	0	8	48	.233	.284	.433	65
José Godoy	2	3	2	0	0	0	0	0	0	2	2	.000	.400	.000	0
**Nick Gordon**	138	405	45	110	28	**4**	9	50	**6**	19	105	.272	.316	.427	173
**Billy Hamilton**	17	7	4	0	0	0	0	0	3	1	4	.000	.125	.000	0
**Caleb Hamilton**	22	18	5	1	0	0	1	1	0	4	14	.056	.227	.222	4
Ryan Jeffers	67	212	25	44	10	1	7	27	0	23	62	.208	.285	.363	77
**Max Kepler**	115	388	54	88	18	1	9	43	3	49	66	.227	.318	.348	135
Alex Kirilloff	45	144	14	36	7	0	3	21	0	5	36	.250	.290	.361	52
Trevor Larnach	51	160	22	37	13	0	5	18	0	18	57	.231	.306	.406	65
**Sandy Leon**	25	56	6	10	3	0	0	4	0	7	23	.179	.270	.232	13
Royce Lewis	12	40	5	12	4	0	2	5	0	1	5	.300	.317	.550	22
**José Miranda**	125	444	45	119	25	0	15	**66**	1	28	91	.268	.325	.426	189
**Jermaine Palacios**	30	70	8	10	0	0	2	6	0	4	27	.143	.184	.229	16
Jorge Polanco	104	375	54	88	16	0	16	56	3	**64**	95	.235	.346	.405	152
**Gary Sánchez**	128	419	42	86	24	0	16	61	2	40	**136**	.205	.282	.377	158
Miguel Sanó	20	60	1	5	0	0	1	3	1	9	25	.083	.211	.133	8
**Gio Urshela**	144	501	61	143	27	3	13	64	1	41	96	.285	.338	.429	215
**Matt Wallner**	18	57	4	13	3	0	2	10	1	6	25	.228	.323	.386	22
**TEAM TOTALS**	162	5476	696	1356	269	18	178	668	38	518	1353	.248	.317	.401	2195

=== Pitching ===
(through October 5, 2022)
Players in bold are on the active roster.

- Note: No ERA or WHIP qualifiers (162 innings, 1 inning per pitched game)

Note: W = Wins; L = Losses; ERA = Earned run average; WHIP = Walks plus hits per inning pitched; G = Games pitched; GS = Games started; SV = Saves; IP = Innings pitched; H = Hits allowed; R = Runs allowed; ER = Earned runs allowed; BB = Walks allowed; K = Strikeouts

Player	W	L	ERA	WHIP	G	GS	SV	IP	H	R	ER	BB	K
Jorge Alcalá	0	0	0.00	1.71	2	0	0	2.1	2	0	0	2	2
**Chris Archer**	2	**8**	4.56	1.31	25	25	0	102.2	87	56	52	**48**	84
**Dylan Bundy**	8	**8**	4.89	1.28	29	**29**	0	140.0	**151**	**79**	**76**	28	94
Yennier Canó	1	0	9.22	2.05	10	0	0	13.2	17	14	14	11	14
Jharel Cotton	2	2	2.83	1.11	25	0	0	35.0	23	13	11	16	31
Danny Coulombe	0	0	1.46	1.30	10	0	0	12.1	7	3	2	9	9
Austin Davis	0	0	16.20	3.00	2	0	0	1.2	1	3	3	4	3
Tyler Duffey	2	4	4.91	1.36	40	0	2	44.0	45	24	24	15	39
**Jhoan Durán**	2	4	1.86	0.98	57	0	8	67.2	50	15	14	16	89
**Michael Fulmer**	2	2	3.70	1.56	26	0	1	24.1	30	10	10	8	22
Chi Chi Gonzalez	0	0	7.71	1.71	2	2	0	7.0	12	6	6	0	4
**Nick Gordon**	0	0	22.09	3.82	4	0	0	3.2	10	9	9	4	0
**Sonny Gray**	8	5	3.08	1.13	24	24	0	119.2	99	44	41	36	117
Ian Hamilton	0	0	6.75	1.50	1	0	0	2.2	3	2	2	1	0
Ronny Henríquez	0	1	2.31	0.94	3	0	0	11.2	8	4	3	3	9
**Griffin Jax**	7	4	3.36	1.05	65	0	1	72.1	56	29	27	20	78
**Jorge López**	0	1	4.37	1.63	23	0	4	22.2	23	11	11	14	18
Tyler Mahle	1	1	4.41	1.04	4	4	0	16.1	13	8	8	4	12
**Trevor Megill**	4	3	4.80	1.49	39	0	0	45.0	50	29	24	17	49
Juan Minaya	1	0	5.59	1.34	6	0	0	9.2	8	6	6	5	11
**Jovani Morán**	0	1	2.21	1.06	31	0	1	40.2	25	11	10	18	54
Bailey Ober	2	3	3.21	1.05	11	11	0	56.0	48	22	20	11	51
Chris Paddack	1	2	4.03	1.21	5	5	0	22.1	25	10	10	2	20
**Emilio Pagán**	4	6	4.43	1.37	59	0	**9**	63.0	60	36	31	26	84
**Jermaine Palacios**	0	0	0.00	0.00	2	0	0	0.2	1	0	0	0	1
Dereck Rodríguez	0	1	3.52	1.43	2	0	0	7.2	7	5	3	4	4
Jhon Romero	0	0	3.60	2.00	4	0	0	5.0	9	2	2	1	6
**Joe Ryan**	**13**	**8**	3.55	1.10	27	27	0	**147.0**	115	60	58	47	**151**
**Aaron Sanchez**	0	1	4.71	1.33	8	3	0	28.2	31	16	15	7	25
**Cole Sands**	0	3	5.87	1.57	11	3	0	30.2	35	21	20	13	28
Devin Smeltzer	5	2	3.71	1.22	15	12	0	70.1	67	30	29	19	40
Joe Smith	1	1	4.61	1.53	34	0	0	27.1	33	18	14	9	17
Cody Stashak	3	0	3.86	0.98	11	0	0	16.1	16	7	7	0	15
**Caleb Thielbar**	4	3	3.49	1.16	**67**	0	1	59.1	51	26	23	18	80
Tyler Thornburg	0	1	2.79	1.03	5	0	0	9.2	4	4	3	6	4
Louie Varland	1	2	3.81	1.23	5	5	0	26.0	26	11	11	6	21
Josh Winder	4	6	4.70	1.30	15	11	0	67.0	69	37	35	18	47
Simeon Woods Richardson	0	1	3.60	1.00	1	1	0	5.0	3	3	2	2	3
**TEAM TOTALS**	78	84	3.98	1.24	162	162	28	1437.0	1320	684	636	468	1336

== Farm system ==
Level	Team	League	Manager
AAA	St. Paul Saints	International League	Toby Gardenhire
AA	Wichita Wind Surge	Texas League	Ramon Borrego
A-Advanced	Cedar Rapids Kernels	Midwest League	Brian Dinkelman
A	Fort Myers Mighty Mussels	Florida State League	Brian Meyer
Rookie	FCL Twins	Florida Complex League	Takashi Miyoshi
Rookie	DSL Twins	Dominican Summer League	Seth Feldman
