= Rush & Molloy =

American gossip columnist duo

George Rush Jr. and Joanna Molloy are a husband and wife team of American gossip columnists whose column, "Rush & Molloy", appeared in the New York Daily News from 1995 to 2010. Their memoir, Scandal: A Manual, was published by Skyhorse in 2013.

Molloy graduated from the University of California, Berkeley, and was previously editor of the Page Six column of the New York Post. Rush graduated from Brown University and earned a graduate degree in journalism from Columbia University. The two were married in 1992. Molloy co-authored the book, The Greatest Beer Run Ever with Chick Donohue, that was later made into a movie.
