= Taylor Branch =

American author and historian (born 1947)

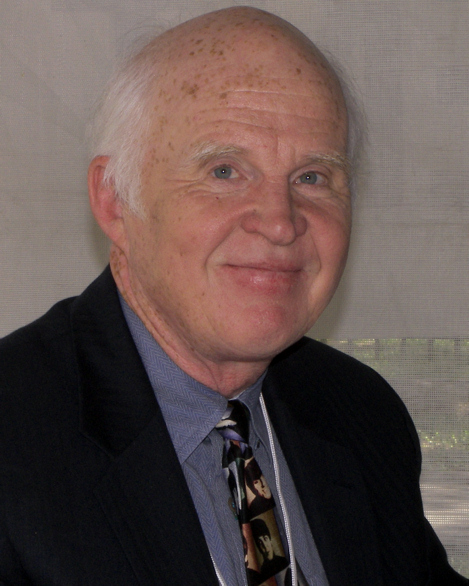
- Branch in 2009
- Born: January 14, 1947 (age 79); Atlanta, Georgia, U.S.
- Education: University of North Carolina, Chapel Hill (BA); Princeton University (MPA)
- Spouse: Christina Macy
- Children: 2
- Writing career
- Genre: Nonfiction
- Notable work: America in the King Years
- Notable awards: MacArthur Fellowship; National Humanities Medal; Pulitzer Prize for History

Taylor Branch (born January 14, 1947) is an American author and historian who wrote a Pulitzer Prize winning trilogy chronicling the life of Martin Luther King Jr. and much of the history of the American civil rights movement. The final volume of the 2,912-page trilogy, collectively called America in the King Years, was released in January 2006, and an abridgment, The King Years: Historic Moments in the Civil Rights Movement, was published in 2013.

== Early life and education ==
Branch graduated from The Westminster Schools in Atlanta in 1964. From there, he went to the University of North Carolina at Chapel Hill on a Morehead Scholarship. He graduated in 1968 and went on to earn an M.P.A. from the Woodrow Wilson School of Public and International Affairs at Princeton University in 1970.

== Career ==
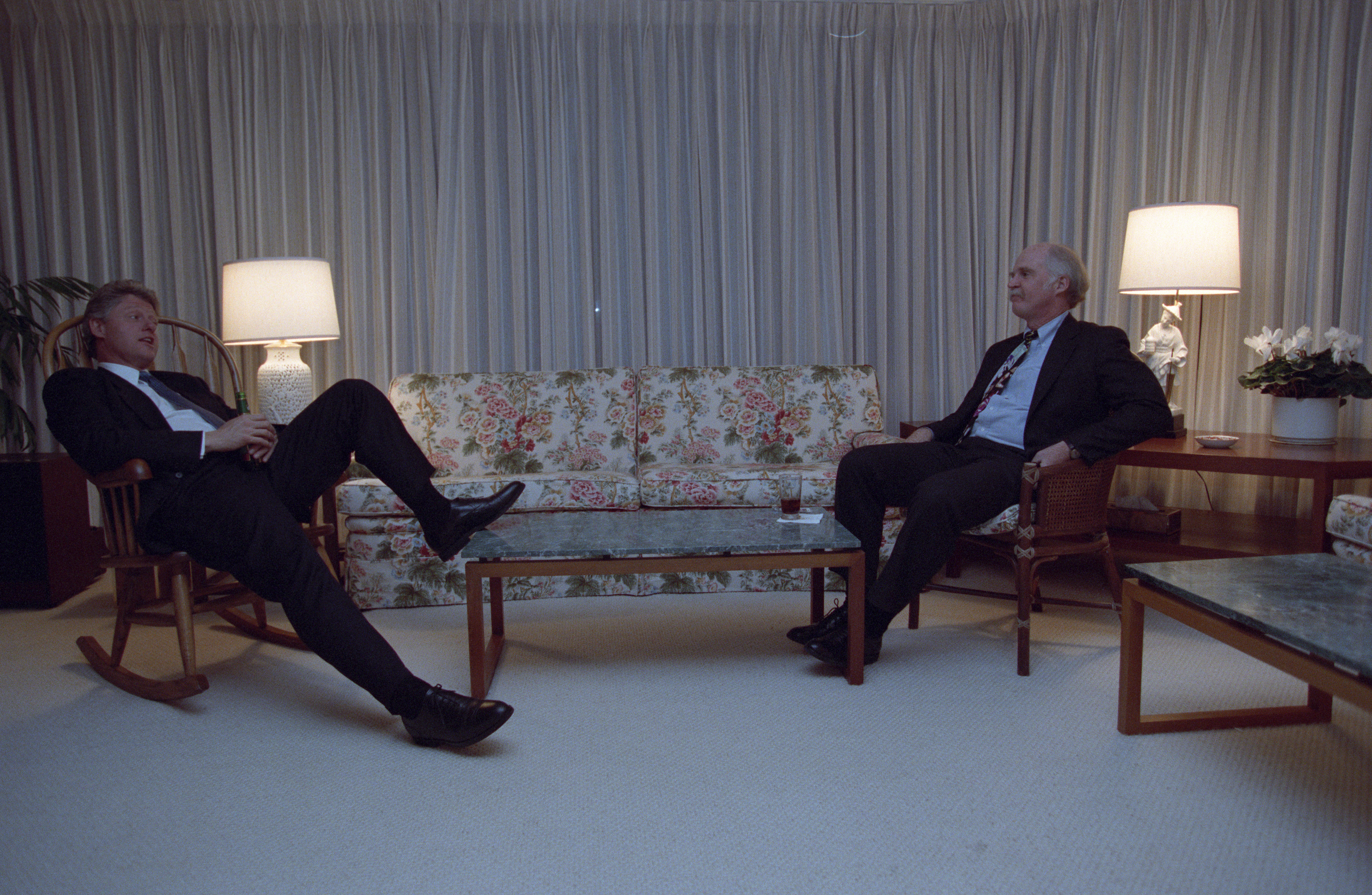
Branch with President Bill Clinton in 1993

Branch served as an assistant editor at The Washington Monthly from 1970 to 1973; he was Washington editor of Harper's from 1973 to 1976; and he was Washington columnist for Esquire Magazine from 1976 to 1977. He also has written for a variety of other publications, including The New York Times Magazine, Sport, The New Republic, and Texas Monthly.

In 1972, Branch worked for the Texas campaign of Democratic presidential nominee George McGovern. Branch shared an apartment in Austin with Bill Clinton, and the two developed a friendship that continues today. He also worked with Hillary Rodham, Bill's then-girlfriend and Yale Law School classmate, and later Clinton's wife.

External videos
- Discussion with Branch on his preparations for writing The Clinton Tapes, April 29, 2007, C-SPAN
- Washington Journal interview with Branch on The Clinton Tapes, September 30, 2009, C-SPAN
- After Words interview with Branch on The Clinton Tapes, October 17, 2009, C-SPAN
- Presentation by Branch on The Clinton Tapes, November 14, 2009, C-SPAN

Branch's book on former president Bill Clinton, The Clinton Tapes: Wrestling History With The President, was written from many tape-recorded interviews and conversations between the two, most of which occurred in the White House during Clinton's two terms in office and which were not disclosed publicly until 2007.

Branch was a lecturer in politics and history at Goucher College from 1998 to 2000. Branch has also taught at the University of Baltimore.

Taylor Branch received a five-year MacArthur Foundation Fellowship (also known as a "genius grant") in 1991 and the National Humanities Medal in 1999. In 2008, he received the Dayton Literary Peace Prize's Lifetime Achievement Award, presented to him by special guest Edwin C. Moses.

In 2013, he co-produced Schooled: The Price of College Sports based on his 2011 book The Cartel.

in 2015, he received the BIO Award from Biographers International Organization, for his contributions to the art and craft of biography.

=== Israeli citizenship controversy ===
A group of Black Hebrew Israelites described as a cult in The New York Times were systematically denied Israeli citizenship over several decades. In 1981, a group of American civil rights activists led by Bayard Rustin investigated and concluded that racism was likely not the cause of the Black Hebrews' treatment. In 1992, Branch opined that the Black Hebrew Israelites' denial of citizenship under the Israeli law of return was because of alleged anti-Black sentiment among Israeli Jews. In 1998, Branch was criticized by Seth Forman, who said Branch's claims seemed to be baseless, particularly in light of Israel's airlift of thousands of black Ethiopian Jews in the early 1990s.

== Family ==
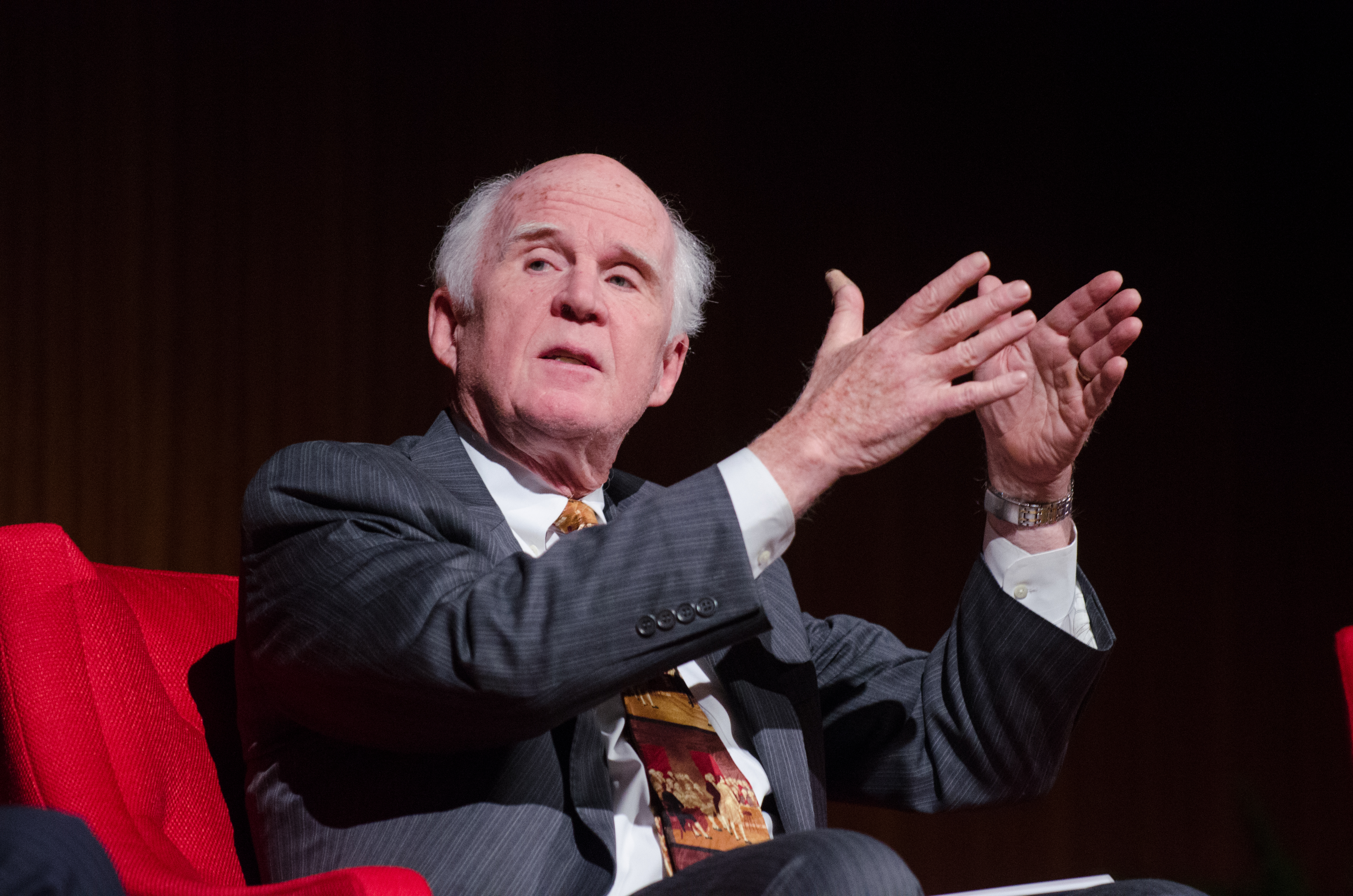
Branch at the LBJ Presidential Library in 2014

Branch lives in Baltimore, Maryland, with his wife, Christina Macy, and their two children, Macy (born 1980) and Franklin (born 1983).

== Books ==
External videos
- In Depth interview with Branch, February 5, 2006, C-SPAN
- Interview with Branch on Parting the Waters, January 16, 1989, C-SPAN
- Booknotes interview with Branch on Pillar of Fire, April 12, 1998, C-SPAN
- Presentation by Branch on At Canaan's Edge, September 30, 2006, C-SPAN
- Interview with Branch on America in the King Years, April 28, 2007, C-SPAN
- Presentation by Branch on The King Years, January 22, 2013, C-SPAN
- Presentation by Branch on The King Years, September 21, 2013, C-SPAN

=== America in the King Years books ===
The America in the King Years trilogy consists of:

- Parting the Waters: America in the King Years, 1954-63 (Simon & Schuster: 1988)
- Pillar of Fire: America in the King Years, 1963-65 (Simon & Schuster: 1998)
- At Canaan's Edge: America in the King Years, 1965-1968 (Simon & Schuster: 2006)
- The King Years: Historic Moments in the Civil Rights Movement (Simon & Schuster 2013), an abridged version of the three books.

=== Standalone history books ===
- Blowing the Whistle: Dissent in the Public Interest (with Charles Peters) (Praeger: 1972)
- Second Wind (with Bill Russell) (Random House: 1979)
- Labyrinth (with Eugene M. Propper): (Viking: 1982, Penguin Books: 1983, ISBN 0-14-006683-7)
- The Clinton Tapes: Wrestling History with the President (Simon & Schuster: 2009)
- The Cartel: Inside the Rise and Imminent Fall of the NCAA (Byliner, 2011)

=== Fiction ===
- The Empire Blues (Simon & Schuster: 1981)

== Awards and recognition ==
Parting the Waters won the Pulitzer Prize for History in 1989, National Book Critics Circle Award for General Nonfiction in 1988, English-Speaking Union Book Award in 1989, the Martin Luther King Memorial Prize in 1989, and was a Finalist for the National Book Award for Nonfiction in 1989.

Pillar of Fire won the American Bar Association's Silver Gavel Award in 1999, the Imus Book Award in 1999, and the Hillman Prize in 1998 At Canaan's Edge won the Heartland Prize for nonfiction from the Chicago Tribune in 2006.
