= Schooled: The Price of College Sports =

- Film poster
- Narrated by: Sam Rockwell
- Music by: Tyler Strickland
- Country of origin: United States
- Original language: English

Production
- Running time: 85 minutes
- Production company: Makuhari Media

Original release
- Release: October 16, 2013

Schooled: The Price of College Sports (also styled as $chooled: The Price of College Sports) is a 2013 documentary film by directors Trevor Martin and Ross Finkel. Based on the Taylor Branch book The Cartel: Inside the Rise and Imminent Fall of the NCAA, the film explores the history and business of college sports as well as the treatment of NCAA athletes.

== Summary ==
For several decades the idea of compensation for student-athletes has come and gone, with every challenge to the rules and regulations of the NCAA handed a blow to the gut each and every time. When Walter Byers coined the term student-athlete nearly six decades ago, he may have protected the NCAA from such attempts to classify student-athletes as employees, which would therefore intend for them to be compensated for their services. Schooled: The Price Of College Sports presents arguments for the rights of athletes in the form of a documentary. Arian Foster, Jonathan Franklin, and several other current and former collegiate athletes gave their opinions on the Price of College Sports.

== Cast ==
- Jay Bilas
- Taylor Branch
- Joe Nocera
- Bob Costas
- Frank Deford
- Arian Foster
- Mary Willingham
- Devon Ramsay
- Wallace Renfro
- Kent Waldrep
- Domonique Foxworth
- Johnathan Franklin
- Michael Hausfeld
- Sonny Vaccaro
- Sam Rockwell
- Ed O'Bannon

== Synopsis ==
The screen is filled with the sounds, sights and, atmosphere of a College Football Saturday. Inside the locker room of the Florida State Seminoles it is gameday and everyone is pumped up and excited for the game. Dominique Foxworth tells the story of how he began at a young age playing football until coming to realize the path he had to take to become a professional football player. Arian Foster, Wallace Renfro and Frank Deford explains how the NCAA owns the way to professional sports. They explain that over 1,200 universities join together to form the NCAA. The NCAA is in charge of enforcing the rules set by the member schools. Nearly 450,000 students must adhere to these rules. Johnathan Franklin shows the listeners the life of a college football player. Johnathan explains his life and his path to college. He explains that football was the way he was able to get to college. Franklin explains that the university uses players in any way they can to promote UCLA Football in order to bring in revenue. The statement is made that Franklin’s scholarship is worth nearly 28,000 dollars although the school estimates the total cost of attendance is around 31,500 which is a shortfall of around 3,500 dollars. Arian Foster discusses, that when reality kicks in that they have no food, no money, and no way to get the necessities. Arian states that the NCAA’s rules and regulations are so manipulative that there is no way to talk bad about them because if you do you have the chance of a fallout from speaking against the NCAA. Jeff Locke states the NCAA has full control of your eligibility thus there not being many people speaking against the NCAA. The statistic that every year college sports bring in a whopping 12 billion dollars per year and is a proven stable business goes to show why in most states the highest paid public official is a college basketball or football coach. The foundation of this big money business is shown to be student-athletes who are offered something priceless which is a free education. College sports in the United States is discussed as being a big money business. Student-athletes are described as amateurs and that they are playing for the love of the sport and not money. Amateurism is said to have started in England where students played sports on the side for fun. After the realization that college sports were becoming involved seriously with gambling and fraud the idea that offering athletes a free education would get rid of that culture. Joe Nocera recognizes that billions of dollars are being generated by the labor of these student-athletes. The chancellor of the University of Nebraska says he sees them as students learning and growing not to earn wages. Taylor Branch, an outspoken critic of the NCAA speaks that student-athletes have no representation let alone equal rights. When salaries are brought up to NCAA president Mark Emmert, he says that there are no salaries and that there is no debate about it because athletes are not employees, they are students. The term student-athlete was coined by Walter Byers in the 1950s in order to give the NCAA leverage so that they would not have to pay wages. Kent Waldrep explains the serious effect on health, such as his paralysis, that college athletics can cause and the paths that the NCAA uses to avoid compensation. The commentator then explains the true development of the NCAA occurred around 1951 and how the college powerhouse began to gain power with each deal that was made. Sonny Vaccaro explains how he began to use college athletes for advertisement by setting up deals with coaches in return for their players wearing NIKE apparel. He then explains that at the end of the day, after all of this money was changing hands, the students never got any of the money. The first academic support center for athletes was founded at the University of Iowa State and this was a major problem because top athletes were ill-prepared for college. Academic fraud began to come into the picture after the realization that a large percentage of student-athletes were not academically fit to perform. The academic scandal at UNC is described in detail.

Devon Ramsay explains his academic career and how just a couple emails between himself and an academic tutor turned into his dismissal from UNC because it was declared academic fraud and unethical conduct by the NCAA although there was hardly any evidence to prove that he had done anything wrong.

Joe Nocera explains how the NCAA is a cartel in the sense that they hold a monopoly on the power over collegiate athletes. Arian Foster questions where the basis of the rules and regulations that the NCAA enforces come from and how they can say that athletes cannot be paid.

Walter Byers upon retirement gives a speech in which he states that the rules and regulations which he put in place will someday be thrown out on the basis of compensation. The class action case with Ed O’Bannon as a plaintiff argues that athletes, even after graduation, still receive no benefits from the commercialization of collegiate athletics.

Upon the removal of amateurism in the olympics, the realization of what it takes to be an athlete allowed olympians to obtain endorsements and benefits while being athletes.

All of the cast is in favor of compensation and then gave their explanations and reasons why athletes need a voice and representation and where a solution will begin.

== Controversy ==
On September 20, 2013 Sports Illustrated released an online clip of the documentary featuring Arian Foster admitting to getting paid under-the-table while playing football for the University of Tennessee.

== Production/Release ==
The film was produced by Andrew J. Muscato, Taylor Branch and Domonique Foxworth. Former baseball manager Bobby Valentine was an Executive Producer on the film. On October 16, 2013, Schooled premiered in the United States on the subscription channel Epix. It has since been released on home video via Amazon Prime and iTunes.

== Music ==
The film features an original score by Tyler Strickland as well as songs from hip-hop artists such as Oddisee and TNGHT.
