= In Our Image: America's Empire in the Philippines =

1989 book by Stanley Karnow

- Cover of the first edition
- Author: Stanley Karnow
- Language: English
- Subject: Philippine–American War
- Publisher: Random House
- Publication date: 1989
- Publication place: United States
- Media type: Print
- Pages: 494
- Awards: Pulitzer Prize for History
- ISBN: 9780394549750

In Our Image: America's Empire in the Philippines is a 1989 book by American journalist Stanley Karnow, published by Random House. The book details the Philippine–American War (1899–1902) and the subsequent American occupation of the islands. Karnow described the book as "the story of America's only major colonial experience. How did we perform? What did we do there? What have we left there?" Karnow was a journalist in southeast Asia from 1959 to 1974. He made six trips to the Philippines for research while writing the book, and also drew heavily on archives.

The book was awarded the 1990 Pulitzer Prize for History.

Karnow worked concurrently on, and was the ‘chief correspondent’ and narrator for, a companion three-part PBS television documentary, The U.S. and the Philippines: In Our Image, which aired in 1989.

Preceded by Battle Cry of Freedom; Parting the Waters: America in the King Years, 1954–63	Pulitzer Prize for History; 1990	Succeeded by A Midwife's Tale
