= Omari K. Chancellor =

Crucian-American actor

Omari K. Chancellor is a Crucian-American actor and filmmaker known for his role in Peter Farrelly's 2022 war biopic, The Greatest Beer Run Ever.

== Early life ==
Chancellor was born to Trinidadian immigrants Eric and Torea Chancellor and raised on the island of Saint Croix in the U.S. Virgin Islands. He attended Roanoke College in Salem, Virginia where he played soccer and rugby. He also holds an MFA from New York University's Graduate Acting Program at the Tisch School of the Arts.

== Career ==
Just after finishing at NYU, Chancellor joined the cast of The Greatest Beer Run Ever, playing MP Erickson, a soldier aiding John “Chickie” Donohue in his travels.

They made their commercial directing debut in 2025, helming Puma's national Back-to-School campaign.

Chancellor recurred on Ryan Murphy's romantic drama series Love Story.

In 2026, Chancellor starred in a revival of Fences at The Old Globe Theatre in San Diego, California. He played Cory Maxson opposite Dorian Missick and De’Adre Aziza as Troy and Rose, respectively.

== Personal life ==
Chancellor resides in New York City. He is the founder of Brooklyn-based production company Gyaldem.us.

== Filmography ==
Film & Television

Year	Title	Role	Notes
2021	The One?	Darius	Also writer, director, and producer
2021	House of Brotherly Love	Jalen	Short Film
2022	The Greatest Beer Run Ever	Erickson	
2023	Swipe NYC	Trevor	
2024	Elsbeth	Hunter McGrath	Episode: "Ball Girl"
2026	Chicago Med	Travis Abbott	Episode: "The Book of Charles"
2026	Love Story	Gordon Henderson	Recurring
TBA	California Skate	Emory	

- Theatre

Year	Title	Role	Venue
2019	soft	Antoine	Regional, Williamstown Theatre Festival
2023	Amani	Robert / Davion / Lamar	Off-Broadway, Rattlestick Playwrights Theater
2026	Fences	Cory	Regional, Old Globe Theatre
2026	Purpose	Nazareth Jasper	Regional, Huntington Theatre Company
