= The Greatest Beer Run Ever =

2022 American film by Peter Farrelly

- Release poster
- Directed by: Peter Farrelly
- Screenplay by: Peter Farrelly; Brian Currie; Pete Jones
- Based on: The Greatest Beer Run Ever by: John "Chickie" Donohue; Joanna Molloy
- Produced by: David Ellison; Dana Goldberg; Don Granger; Andrew Muscato; Jake Myers
- Starring: Zac Efron; Russell Crowe
- Cinematography: Sean Porter
- Edited by: Patrick J. Don Vito
- Music by: Dave Palmer
- Production companies: Skydance Media; Living Films
- Distributed by: Apple TV+
- Release dates: September 13, 2022 (TIFF); September 23, 2022 (United States)
- Running time: 126 minutes
- Country: United States
- Language: English

The Greatest Beer Run Ever is a 2022 American biographical war comedy drama film, co-written and directed by Peter Farrelly, based on the book of the same name by John "Chickie" Donohue and Joanna Molloy. The film, starring Zac Efron and Russell Crowe, follows the true story of Donohue, who, as a young man, sneaks into the Vietnam War to deliver some beer to his friends while they serve their duty.

The Greatest Beer Run Ever had its world premiere at the 2022 Toronto International Film Festival on September 13, 2022, and released in select US theaters on September 23 and on Apple TV+ on September 30, 2022, by Apple Studios. The film received mixed reviews from critics.

== Plot ==
In 1967, Marine Corps veteran John "Chickie" Donohue is a slacking merchant seaman who lives with his family in Inwood, New York City. His sister Christine is strongly opposed to the Vietnam War. Chickie and his friends attend the funeral of an old friend that has been killed in action, and are informed that another close friend, Tommy, has gone missing in action. Chickie and Red discuss lifting the spirits of their friends serving overseas and Chickie decides to deliver beers to them in South Vietnam.

Chickie sails to Saigon with a duffle bag full of Pabst Blue Ribbon cans. Military police officer Tommy Collins urges Chickie to stay out of danger and go home, but helps map out a plan for reaching Chickie's other friends. He travels to LZ Jane via Bien Hoa Air Base and Da Nang Air Base searching for Rick Duggan, serving in the 1st Cavalry Division. Duggan's sergeant summons him by radio, and he's exposed to enemy fire returning to the command post. Duggan allows Chickie to join his squad on the battlefield as they fire at the Viet Cong from trenches. Chickie passes beers out that night, and Duggan informs Chickie that one of their friends, Reynolds, was killed.

Travelling alone to Kontum Airfield by helicopter, Chickie watches two CIA agents interrogate a prisoner before throwing him to his death, and the agents pursue him as he requests a ride to Saigon. He runs into the jungle to elude them, and after he emerges that night is reunited with Kevin "Looney" McLoone who arranges a flight to Pleiku. Chickie throws him his beer as the helicopter ascends.

In Saigon, Chickie learns his ship has sailed for the Philippines due to warnings of an impending attack. Hieu directs him to the U.S. Embassy where a woman arranges a flight to Manila in the Philippines to rejoin the ship. He returns to the Caravelle Hotel and shows anti-war journalists photos as proof that he went to LZ Jane. When the Viet Cong invades Saigon in the surprise Tet Offensive, Chickie and photographer Arthur Coates explore the streets, where Chickie sees Hieu killed in the Viet Cong attack on US Embassy, as well as a US military vehicle blowing a hole in the perimeter wall from the outside. Coates photographs the aftermath of the embassy attack. The two drive to the scene of an explosion at Long Binh Post, where Coates explains that the military would rather fake an entry hole in the embassy wall than admit that the attack was an inside job. Chickie shares a beer with one last wounded friend, Bobby Pappas, who confirms Tommy Minogue's death.

Epilogue: Chickie returns home with a changed perspective on the war. He sits in a park among tributes for soldiers and shares his last beer with Christine. Collins, Duggan, McLoone, and Pappas returned from the war alive, and they all, "mostly," quit drinking. Although he never realized his childhood dreams of becoming a police officer, or selling peanuts at the Polo Grounds, Chickie graduated high school and Harvard University's Kennedy School of Government. After a long career with the New York City tunnel builders sandhog union, he eventually became their legislative and political director. A contemporary photograph of "The Boys Today" illustrates the real-life Inwood friends, Duggan, Pappas, Chickie, Collins, and McLoone.

== Cast ==
- Zac Efron as John "Chickie" Donohue
- Bill Murray as The Colonel
- Russell Crowe as Arthur Coates
- Kyle Allen as Bobby Pappas
- Jake Picking as Rick Duggan
- Will Ropp as Kevin McLoone
- Archie Renaux as Tommy Collins
- Ruby Ashbourne Serkis as Christine Donahue
- Will Hochman as Tommy Minogue
- Christopher Reed Brown as Noodle
- Joe Adler as Red
- MacGregor Arney as Brendon
- Hal Cumpston as Leary
- Kristin Carey as Mrs. Minogue
- Paul Adelstein as Mr. Donahue
- Matt Cook as Lt. Habershaw
- Shirleyann Kaladjian as Mrs. Donahue
- Kevin Tran as Hieu "Oklahoma"
- Omari K. Chancellor as Erickson
- Carlos Arroyo as Sgt. Major Pérez
- Goya Robles as Almeida

== Production ==
In 2015, Andrew Muscato produced and directed a short documentary The Greatest Beer Run Ever. The short was released on the Pabst Blue Ribbon YouTube Channel on Veterans Day November 11, 2015. The documentary was based on the true story of John "Chickie" Donohue who sailed to Vietnam to deliver beers to friends from the old neighborhood. He later said that he "was a staunch supporter of the war. But when I got there, I saw things that just weren't right, and it was just false, totally false."

On April 26, 2019, as soon as Skydance Media picked up the rights to adapt the book The Greatest Beer Run Ever to film, Peter Farrelly came on board to write the script with Brian Currie and Pete Jones as well as direct the movie. David Ellison, Dana Goldberg and Don Granger would produce for Skydance along with Andrew Muscato. Viggo Mortensen was cast in the film, with Dylan O'Brien joining him soon after.

In March 2021, the film was picked up by Apple Studios, with Mortensen and O'Brien no longer involved. Zac Efron and Russell Crowe entered negotiations to join the cast to replace O'Brien and Mortensen with Bill Murray courted for a supporting role. Efron and Crowe were confirmed to join the cast in July 2021. Filming was expected at the time to begin in August 2021, either in Australia or New Zealand. Jake Picking, Will Ropp, Archie Renaux and Kyle Allen were cast in September 2021. Murray would be confirmed in October, with Ruby Ashbourne Serkis, Matt Cook, Omari K. Chancellor and Will Hochman joining the next month.

Filming began in September 2021, and was shot on location in both Thailand and New Jersey; specifically Newark, North Bergen, Jersey City and Paterson.

== Release ==
The Greatest Beer Run Ever had its world premiere at the 2022 Toronto International Film Festival on September 13, 2022, and was released in the United States by Apple Studios in select theaters on September 23, 2022, and on Apple TV+ on September 30, 2022.

== Reception ==
On the review aggregator website Rotten Tomatoes, the film holds an approval rating of 43% based on 118 reviews. The site's critics consensus reads, "Far from intoxicating, The Greatest Beer Run Ever reduces its fun fact-based story to a flat, flavorless brew." Metacritic assigned the film a weighted average score of 39 out of 100 based on 30 critics, indicating "generally unfavorable" reviews. In its first week of release, The Greatest Beer Run Ever was the tenth most popular TV show or movie on streaming in the United States.

Former United States Secretary of State John Kerry, a Vietnam War veteran, wrote an op-ed for The Boston Globe in support of the film. In the op-ed, which was published on September 22, 2022, Kerry wrote, "For those of us of the Vietnam generation, the film is a poignant reminder that, whatever we did in that time and whatever our political perspective, how we experienced Vietnam is inextricably intertwined with who we experienced it with."

The film's screenplay written by Peter Farrelly, Brian Currie and Pete Jones, was nominated for a 2023 Humanitas Prize in the Comedy Feature Film category.

== See also ==
- List of biographical films
