= America in the King Years =

Three-volume history series by Taylor Branch

Parting the Waters: America in the King Years, 1954–63
- Author: Taylor Branch
- Language: English
- Series: America in the King Years
- Subject: Martin Luther King Jr., Civil Rights Movement
- Genre: Biography
- Publisher: Simon & Schuster
- Publication date: 1988
- Publication place: United States
- Media type: Print
- Pages: 1,088
- ISBN: 0-671-46097-8
- OCLC: 18383661

Pillar of Fire: America in the King Years, 1963–65
- Publication date: 1998
- Pages: 768
- ISBN: 0-684-80819-6
- OCLC: 37909869

At Canaan's Edge: America in the King Years, 1965–1968
- Publication date: 2006
- Pages: 1,056
- ISBN: 0-684-85712-X
- OCLC: 62118415

America in the King Years is a three-volume history of Martin Luther King Jr. and the Civil Rights Movement by Taylor Branch, which he wrote between 1982 and 2006. The three individual volumes have won a variety of awards, including the 1989 Pulitzer Prize for History.

The titles of the three volumes, Parting the Waters, Pillar of Fire, and At Canaan's Edge, were all drawn from aspects of the Old Testament Book of Exodus – namely, the Crossing of the Red Sea, the manifestation of God that allowed the Israelites to travel by night, and the Promised Land, which Moses was able to see into, but did not live long enough to enter.

A one-volume summary of the series was published in 2013.

== Background ==
In the early 1980s, Branch planned to spend three years writing about America during the civil rights era, focusing on Martin Luther King Jr. As Branch proceeded with his work, the project ended up becoming a 24-year endeavor.

Branch described his approach to writing the King trilogy as follows:

Storytelling--to do it in storytelling. I--one of the reasons I wanted to do it was that I knew this had an enormous impact, somewhat like the Civil War and Reconstruction period a century before. But most of the books I read seemed to me analytical and argumentative, reinventing new labels of analysis. And I felt that they didn't have the power to really describe what happened at the personal level, which is where I think we really learn about race across the divisions that we have. And so I really resolved from some lessons out of my experience that I wanted to try to keep it at a storytelling level and follow the stories wherever they went. I just didn't know that there would be so many of them or that they would be from such broad context; that I'd be chronicling King's relationship with Rabbi Abraham Heschel or something like--you know, these are things that I didn't--had no way of anticipating. So I just kind of--I followed storytelling, but it tumbled me off into more worlds than I'd planned on.

== Parting the Waters ==
Parting the Waters: America in the King Years, 1954–63, the first book in the trilogy, was published in 1988. Events detailed in this volume include the Montgomery bus boycott, the 1961 Freedom Rides, the 1963 Birmingham campaign and Children's Crusade, and the 1963 March on Washington for Jobs and Freedom.

It shared the 1989 Pulitzer Prize for History with James McPherson's history of the American Civil War, Battle Cry of Freedom. It also won the 1988 National Book Critics Circle Award for General Nonfiction, and was a 1989 finalist for the National Book Award in the Non-Fiction category.

The cover of the book uses a reversed portion of the iconic photograph of the 1965 march from Selma to Montgomery taken by Look magazine photographer James Karales.

== Pillar of Fire ==
The second volume, Pillar of Fire: America in the King Years, 1963–65, was published in 1998. It covers such events as the Assassination of President Kennedy, the Mississippi Freedom Summer, and King's acceptance of the Nobel Peace Prize.

== At Canaan's Edge ==
The final book in the trilogy, At Canaan's Edge: America in the King Years, 1965–1968, was published in 2006. Among the subjects it covers are the Selma to Montgomery marches, the 1966 Chicago Open Housing Movement, Dr. King's participation in the Anti-Vietnam War movement, the Watts Riots, and the events leading up to King's assassination.

It was the winner of the Chicago Tribune's Heartland Prize for Non-Fiction in 2006.

== The King Years: Historic Moments in the Civil Rights Movement ==
A one-volume summary of Branch's trilogy, The King Years: Historic Moments in the Civil Rights Movement, was published by Simon & Schuster in 2013.

== HBO miniseries ==
Although in 2010 Oprah Winfrey's production company, Harpo, announced that it would be partnering with HBO to produce a miniseries based on Branch's trilogy, to be written by Robert Schenkkan. The series has not yet been filmed.

Preceded by The Launching of Modern American Science, 1846–1876	Pulitzer Prize for History; 1989 (shared with Battle Cry of Freedom)	Succeeded by In Our Image
