= Andrew Muscato =

American film director and producer

- Born: Andrew Joseph Muscato; November 26, 1985 (age 40); Morristown, New Jersey, U.S.
- Education: New York University
- Occupation: Filmmaker
- Years active: 2008–present

Andrew Joseph Muscato (born November 26, 1985) is an American film director and producer. He is known for the feature films The Greatest Beer Run Ever and Balls Up as well as the documentary films The Zen of Bobby V., Schooled: The Price of College Sports, and New Worlds: The Cradle of Civilization

== Early life ==
Muscato was born in Morristown, New Jersey. He was raised in the Basking Ridge section of Bernards Township, New Jersey, where he attended Ridge High School. He graduated from New York University Tisch School of the Arts.

== Career ==
While still an undergrad film student at NYU he produced his first feature documentary The Zen of Bobby V. for ESPN. The film chronicles baseball manager Bobby Valentine's career in Japan. Muscato and Valentine would go on to form the production company Makuhari Media. The company produces sports themed documentaries. The company's first documentary, Ballplayer: Pelotero, was met with both critical acclaim, and controversy.

In 2013, he directed his debut feature documentary Branca's Pitch, about Brooklyn Dodgers pitcher Ralph Branca.

Muscato produced and narrated an episode of ESPN's 30 for 30 podcast series. The episode, "The Loophole" (season 4, episode 4), chronicles Japanese baseball pitcher Hideo Nomo's journey to Major League Baseball. It debuted in November 2018.

A year later, Muscato produced a three-part investigative documentary for The Athletic into head trauma research at UNC-Chapel Hill. The documentary, "Failure to Disclose" was hosted by Armen Keteyian.

In 2021, he directed the concert documentary, New Worlds: The Cradle of Civilization, an Official Selection of the 74th Cannes Film Festival.

Along with Skydance Media, he produced The Greatest Beer Run Ever, directed by Academy Award winner Peter Farrelly. It premiered at the 2022 Toronto International Film Festival. In February 2023, it was announced that Muscato and Skydance Media would re-team to produce another Peter Farrelly movie, Balls Up.

== Filmography ==
Year	Title	Credit	Note
2008	The Zen of Bobby V	Producer	Documentary
2012	Ballplayer: Pelotero	Executive producer	Documentary
2013	Branca's Pitch	Director and producer	Documentary
2013	Schooled: The Price of College Sports	Producer	Documentary
2015	After Schooled	Director and producer	Documentary short
2015	Doped: The Dirty Side of Sports	Director, writer and producer	Documentary
2015	The Greatest Beer Run Ever	Director and producer	Documentary short
2016	Checkmates	Director and producer	Documentary short
2016	My Life with Ali	Director and producer	TV documentary
2016	Muhammad Ali: A Life	Director and producer	TV documentary
2017	The Sprinter Factory	Producer	Documentary short
2018	Vice Presents: Red Cards - The Donaghy Paradox	Director and producer	Documentary Series
2018	Mooch	Director and producer	Documentary
2019	American Swamp	Co-Executive Producer	Documentary Series / MSNBC
2021	New Worlds: The Cradle of Civilization	Director and producer	Documentary
2022	The Greatest Beer Run Ever	Producer	Feature film
2026	Balls Up	Producer	Feature film
2026	I Play Rocky	Executive Producer	Feature film

== Awards and nominations ==
Year	Result	Award	Category	Work	Ref.
2021	Nominated	Cannes Film Festival	Golden Eye	New Worlds: The Cradle of Civilization	
