= Gustavo Núñez (baseball) =

Dominican Republic baseball player (born 1988)

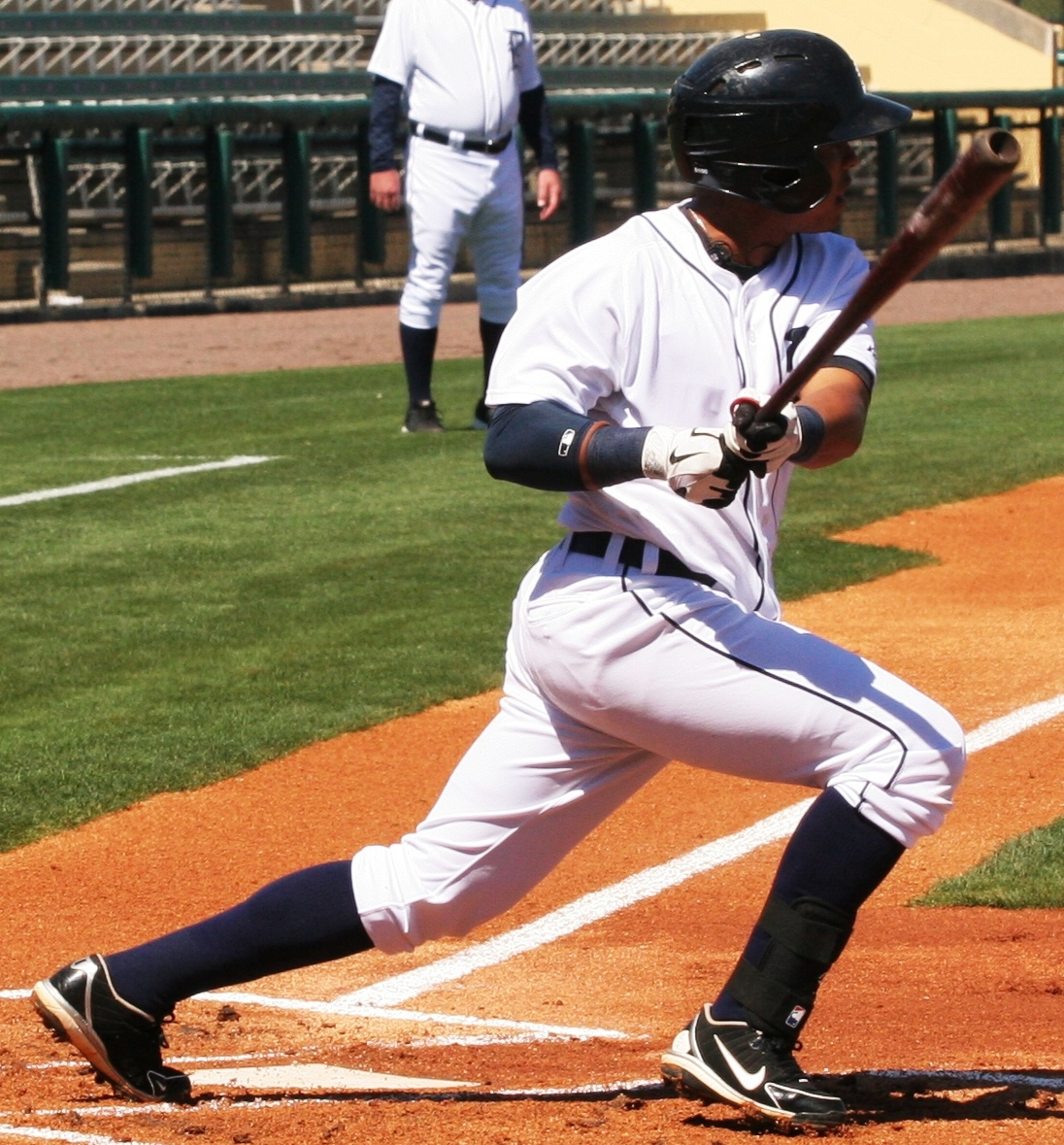
- Núñez with the Detroit Tigers in 2015

Sultanes de Monterrey – No. 4
- Infielder
- Born: February 8, 1988 (age 38); San Pedro de Macorís, Dominican Republic
- Bats: Switch Throws: Right
- Stats at Baseball Reference
Medals
Men's baseball
Representing Dominican Republic
Olympic Games
Bronze medal – third place	2020 Tokyo	Team

Gustavo Adolfo Núñez (born February 8, 1988) is a Dominican professional baseball infielder for the Sultanes de Monterrey of the Mexican League. Núñez signed with the Detroit Tigers as an international free agent in 2007.

== Career ==
=== Detroit Tigers ===
Núñez signed as an international free agent with the Detroit Tigers on May 3, 2007. He made his professional debut for the Dominican Summer League Tigers. In 2008, he played for the rookie-level Gulf Coast League Tigers and the High-A Lakeland Flying Tigers, hitting .235 in 58 games. Núñez split the 2009 season between the GCL Tigers and the Single-A West Michigan Whitecaps, batting .276/.333/.386 with 5 home runs and 26 RBI. In January 2010, Baseball America named Nunez the #7 prospect in the Tigers organization and the best defensive infielder in the Tigers organization. In 2010, he returned to Lakeland, slashing .222/.263/.281 with 2 home runs and 33 RBI in 128 games. In 2011, he split the year between Lakeland and the Double-A Erie SeaWolves, accumulating a .276/.333/.386 slash line with 5 home runs and 26 RBI. In 2011, while playing for Lakeland, he was named to the Florida State League Mid-Season All-Star team.

=== Pittsburgh Pirates ===
On December 8, 2011, the Pittsburgh Pirates selected Núñez from the Tigers in the Rule 5 draft. In February 2012, Núñez was placed on the 60-day disabled list with an ankle injury. The injury kept him out of games until August 13, 2012, when he began a rehab assignment with the Gulf Coast League Pirates, and also rehabbed with the High-A Bradenton Marauders and the Double-A Altoona Curve. He ended the 2012 season on the disabled list.

=== Detroit Tigers (second stint) ===
On October 26, 2012, the Arizona Diamondbacks claimed Núñez, with the Rule 5 restrictions still in effect. On December 21, the Diamondbacks returned Núñez to the Tigers. He spent the entirety of the 2013 season with the Triple-A Toledo Mud Hens, batting .194/.242/.215 with no home runs and 4 RBI. Núñez was released by the Tigers organization on October 24, 2013.

=== Atlanta Braves ===
On November 30, 2013, Núñez signed a minor league contract with the Atlanta Braves organization. He spent the 2014 season with the Double-A Mississippi Braves, and hit .301/.353/.373 with 2 home runs and 31 RBi in 97 games with the team.

=== Pittsburgh Pirates (second stint) ===
On November 18, 2014, Núñez signed a minor league contract with the Pittsburgh Pirates organization. He spent the 2015 season with the Triple-A Indianapolis Indians, batting .276/.326/.329 with 2 home runs and 24 RBI in 103 games. On November 6, 2015, he elected free agency.

=== Detroit Tigers (third stint) ===
On January 11, 2016, Núñez signed a minor league deal to return to the Detroit Tigers organization. He spent the 2016 season with Double-A Erie, logging a .279/.350/.348 slash line with 2 home runs and 31 RBI in 86 games. He began the 2017 season with Erie before being released by Detroit on April 27, 2017.

=== New York Mets ===
On May 11, 2017, Núñez signed a minor league contract with the New York Mets organization. He finished the season with the Double-A Binghamton Rumble Ponies, posting a .270/.307/.344 slash line with 1 home run and 24 RBI. On November 6, he elected free agency.

=== Tecolotes de los Dos Laredos ===
On May 3, 2018, Núñez signed with the Tecolotes de los Dos Laredos of the Mexican League. In 22 games with the Tecolotes, Núñez batted .259/.333/.341 with 1 home run and 6 RBI.

On March 5, 2020, Núñez signed with the Somerset Patriots of the independent Atlantic League of Professional Baseball. However, Núñez did not play in a game in 2020 due to the cancellation of the Atlantic League season because of the COVID-19 pandemic. He became a free agent after the year.

=== Guerreros de Oaxaca ===
On January 31, 2022, Núñez signed with the Guerreros de Oaxaca of the Mexican League. In 81 games for Oaxaca, he slashed .309/.373/.429 with four home runs, 40 RBI, and 16 stolen bases.

=== Sultanes de Monterrey ===
On August 1, 2022, Núñez was traded to the Sultanes de Monterrey of the Mexican League. He played in 4 games down the stretch for the Sultanes, going 6-for-15 (.400) with 1 RBI and 4 stolen bases.

=== El Águila de Veracruz ===
On February 24, 2023, Núñez's rights were acquired by El Águila de Veracruz. In 83 games for Veracruz, he batted .279/.364/.382 with 7 home runs, 40 RBI, and 14 stolen bases.

=== Bravos de León ===
On December 4, 2024, Núñez and Jose Miguel Piña were traded to the Bravos de León of the Mexican League in exchange for Alex Reyes and Daniel Bies.

=== Sultanes de Monterrey (second stint) ===
On February 25, 2025, Núñez was traded to the Sultanes de Monterrey in exchange for Jorge Rondón and Jermaine Palacios. In 72 games he hit .341/.410/.530 with 7 home runs, 40 RBIs and 23 stolen bases.

== International career ==
Núñez was named to the Dominican Republic national baseball team for the 2020 Summer Olympics.

== See also ==
- Rule 5 draft results
