= Ballplayer: Pelotero =

2011 documentary film

Ballplayer: Pelotero is a 2011 documentary film directed by Jonathan Paley, Ross Finkel and Trevor Martin. The film follows two teenage Dominican Republic baseball prospects, Miguel Angel Sanó (nicknamed Bocatón) and Jean Carlos Batista, and their journey to be signed by a Major League Baseball team.

The film is narrated by John Leguizamo, and produced by Isaac Solotaroff. It was also produced by Andrew Muscato and Bobby Valentine through their company Makuhari Media.

It premiered at the Hamptons International Film Festival on October 15, 2011. Strand Releasing distributed the film across the United States on July 13, 2012.

In a July 11, 2012 press conference with the Baseball Writers' Association of America Major League Baseball Commissioner Bud Selig criticized the film as "inaccurate." At the same time, Executive Director of the Major League Baseball Players Association Michael Weiner said, "When you expose the kinds of practices ... it's not an easy thing for MLB to see."

In the film, Rene Gayo, Director of Latin American Scouting for the Pittsburgh Pirates, is portrayed as having used MLB’s investigation into Miguel Sano’s true age to scare off other teams, as a way of gaining leverage for the Pirates in negotiations. Gayo was dismissed by the Pirates in 2017. In a statement the Pirates wrote, "As an organization, we concluded that we needed to move in a new and different direction with our Latin American scouting leadership."

On review aggregator website Rotten Tomatoes, the film holds an approval rating of 86% based on 26 reviews. The film's critics' consensus reads, "Gripping and surprisingly nuanced, Ballplayer: Pelotero is a frank exploration of the nature of corruption in baseball recruitment."

In 2024 Variety included the film among its list of the "Best Baseball Movies of All Time".
