= Chick Donohue =

American United States Marine, merchant seaman and trade unionist

John Donohue
- Born: 1941 (age 84–85); New York City, U.S.
- Education: Harvard Kennedy School
- Spouse: Theresa O'Neil
- Military career
- Branch: United States Marine Corps
- Service years: 1958–1964
- Rank: Sergeant
- Nicknames: Chick, Chickie
- Conflicts: Battle of Khe Sanh

John "Chickie" Donohue (born 1941) is an American United States Marine, merchant seaman, and trade unionist. He is best known for his 1968 journey through Vietnam where he delivered beer to several United States service members during the height of the Vietnam War.

== Early life ==
A native of Inwood, New York, a neighborhood in upper Manhattan, Donohue served in the Philippines and Japan with the United States Marines from 1958 to 1964.

== Vietnam beer run ==
In November 1967, influenced by anti-war demonstrations and bartender George Lynch, who worked at a local bar called Doc Fiddler's, Donohue set out on a four-month journey to bring beer to several enlisted men from his neighborhood who were deployed in Vietnam. He landed a job on a merchant ship taking ammunition from New York to Qui Nhon, Vietnam. He arrived on January 19, 1968, and handed out the first beer to Tom Collins, member of the 127th Military Police Company and Donohue's childhood friend. He later travelled to A Shau Valley where he brought beer to two additional Inwood natives, Kevin McLoone and Rick Duggan, and participated briefly in the Battle of Khe Sanh. The following day, he set out for Saigon where he handed out his last beer to Bobby Pappas, a communications specialist in the Army. Having missed the return voyage of his merchant ship, he had to wait for some time before getting a passport and visa through the U.S. Consulate. On the day of his flight out of Saigon, the Tet Offensive started, leaving him stranded in the country. He later latched on as an oiler on a merchant ship destined for New York where he arrived on April 1, 1968.

== Later life ==
In 1970, Donohue bought the pub Doc Fiddler's and ran it for several years. He later was a trade unionist.

== In media ==
Donohue is portrayed by Zac Efron in the biographical action comedy film The Greatest Beer Run Ever (2022), directed by Peter Farrelly.
