= Nick Gordon =

American baseball player (born 1995)

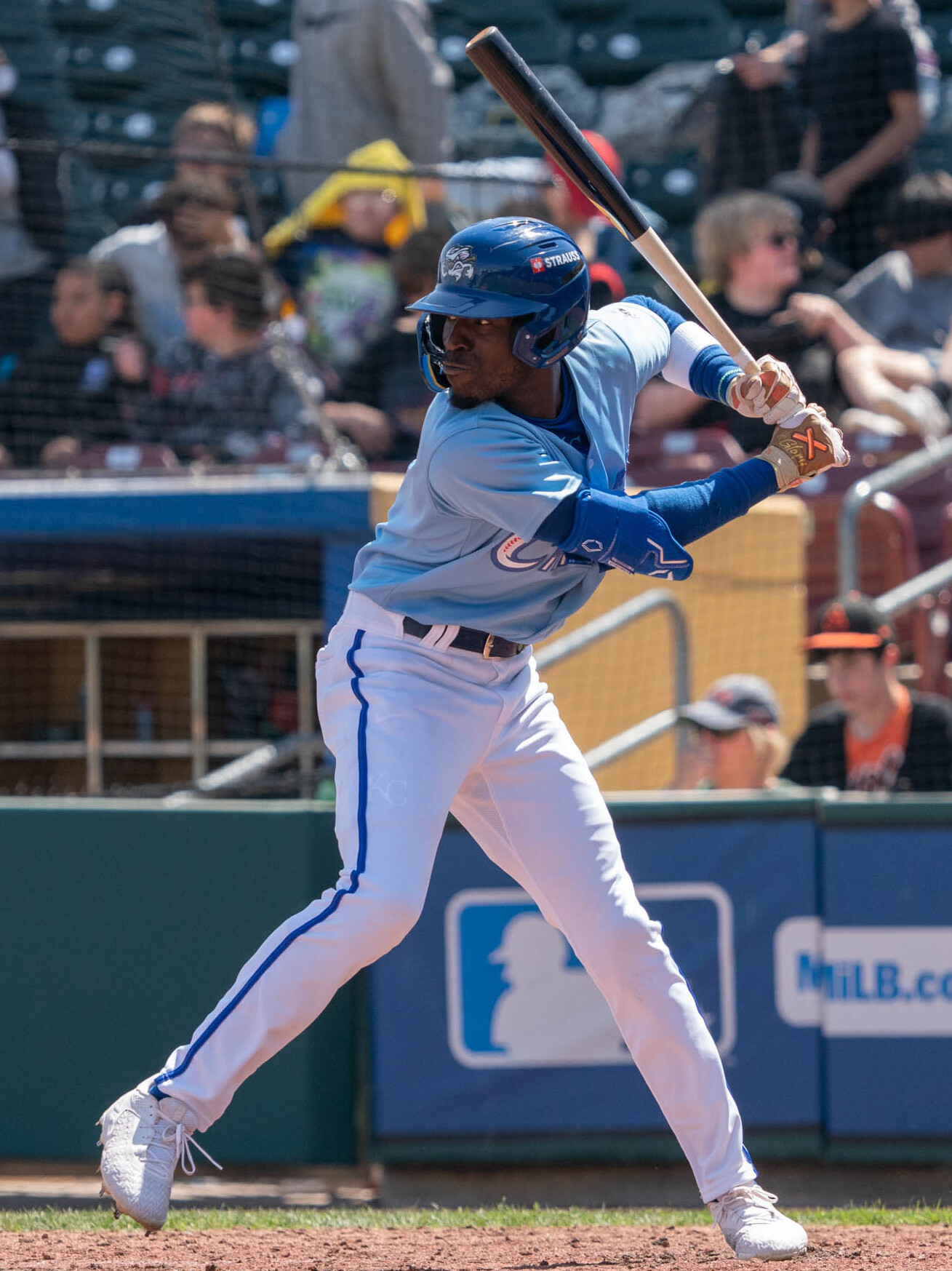
- Gordon with the Omaha Storm Chasers in 2025

Free agent
- Outfielder / Second baseman / Shortstop
- Born: October 24, 1995 (age 30); Avon Park, Florida, U.S.
- Bats: Left Throws: Right

MLB debut
- May 6, 2021, for the Minnesota Twins

MLB statistics (through 2024 season)
- Batting average: .244
- Home runs: 23
- Runs batted in: 112
- Stats at Baseball Reference

Teams
- Minnesota Twins (2021–2023); Miami Marlins (2024)

Nicholas Chad Gordon (born October 24, 1995) is an American professional baseball outfielder and infielder who is a free agent. He has previously played in Major League Baseball (MLB) for the Minnesota Twins and Miami Marlins. He was selected by the Twins in the first round of the 2014 MLB draft, and made his MLB debut with them in 2021.

== Early life ==
Gordon attended Olympia High School in Orlando, Florida. As a junior in 2013, he was the Florida Gatorade Baseball Player of the Year. He hit .505 with two home runs and 30 runs batted in as a batter and as a pitcher he was 5–1 with a 0.78 earned run average (ERA), 44 strikeouts and five saves in 35 2/3 innings pitched. As a senior, he batted .512 with 6 home runs and 28 RBIs in 28 games, leading his team to the Class 8A regional semifinals. He signed a letter of intent to play baseball at Florida State University.

== Professional career ==
=== Minnesota Twins ===
Gordon was considered one of the top prospects for the 2014 Major League Baseball draft. He was selected as the fifth overall pick in the first round by the Minnesota Twins. He signed with the Twins on June 9, receiving a $3.851 million signing bonus. He was assigned to the Elizabethton Twins where he batted .294 with one home run and 28 RBIs. He spent 2015 with the Cedar Rapids Kernels where he posted a .277 batting average with one home run, 58 RBIs, and 25 stolen bases. In 2016, he played for the Fort Myers Miracle, where, in 116 games, he batted .291 with three home runs and 52 RBIs. Gordon spent 2017 with the Double-A Chattanooga Lookouts where he batted .270 with a career high nine home runs and 66 RBIs. Gordon began the 2018 season with Chattanooga, hitting .333 over 42 games, before being promoted to the Triple-A Rochester Red Wings, where he hit .212 with two home runs and 29 RBI in 99 games.

The Twins added Gordon to their 40-man roster after the 2018 season. He was assigned to Rochester at the end of spring training. For the 2019 season he was limited to 70 games due to injury but played well, carrying a slash line of .298/.342/.459 in 319 plate appearances. Prior to the start of the 2020 season, Gordon tested positive for COVID-19.

On April 23, 2021, Gordon was promoted to the major leagues for the first time. On April 26, Gordon was optioned to the alternate training site without making a major league appearance. On May 3, Gordon was recalled to the active roster. He made his MLB debut on May 6 as the starting second baseman against the Texas Rangers. In the game, he registered his first stolen base and his first major league hit, a single off of Rangers starter Jordan Lyles. On June 4, Gordon hit his first major league home run, a solo shot off of Kansas City Royals reliever Wade Davis. On August 5, Gordon was optioned down to Triple-A St. Paul Saints to make room for Rob Refsnyder, who had been taken off the 10-day injured list.

On August 30, 2022, Gordon hit his first career grand slam off of Ryan Brasier of the Boston Red Sox as part of a six–RBI performance. In 2022, Gordon played in 136 games for Minnesota, hitting .272/.316/.427 with 9 home runs, 50 RBI, and 6 stolen bases. His home run and RBI tallies were both career-highs.

On May 17, 2023, in a game against the Los Angeles Dodgers, Gordon fouled a pitch off of his right shin and was replaced by Kyle Farmer in the bottom of the inning. He was later diagnosed with a fractured right tibia and placed on the 60-day injured list on May 29. Prior to the 2024 season Gordon's salary was set by a team of arbiters at $900,000.

=== Miami Marlins ===
On February 11, 2024, the Twins traded Gordon to the Miami Marlins in exchange for Steven Okert. In 95 games for the Marlins, he batted .227/.258/.369 with eight home runs, 32 RBI, and five stolen bases. On August 5, Gordon was designated for assignment by Miami. He cleared waivers and was sent outright to the Triple–A Jacksonville Jumbo Shrimp on August 8. Gordon elected free agency on October 10.

=== Baltimore Orioles ===
On December 31, 2024, Gordon signed a minor league contract with the Baltimore Orioles. He played in four games for the Triple-A Norfolk Tides, going 4-for-13 (.308) with one stolen base.

=== Kansas City Royals ===
On April 5, 2025, the Orioles traded Gordon to the Kansas City Royals in exchange for cash considerations. In 16 appearances for the Triple-A Omaha Storm Chasers, he batted .260/.327/.320 with four RBI and two stolen bases. Gordon was released by the Royals organization on May 1.

== Personal life ==
His father, Tom Gordon, played in the major leagues from 1988 to 2009. His paternal half-brother, Dee Strange-Gordon, also played in the major leagues.
