= Josh Winder =

American baseball player (born 1996)

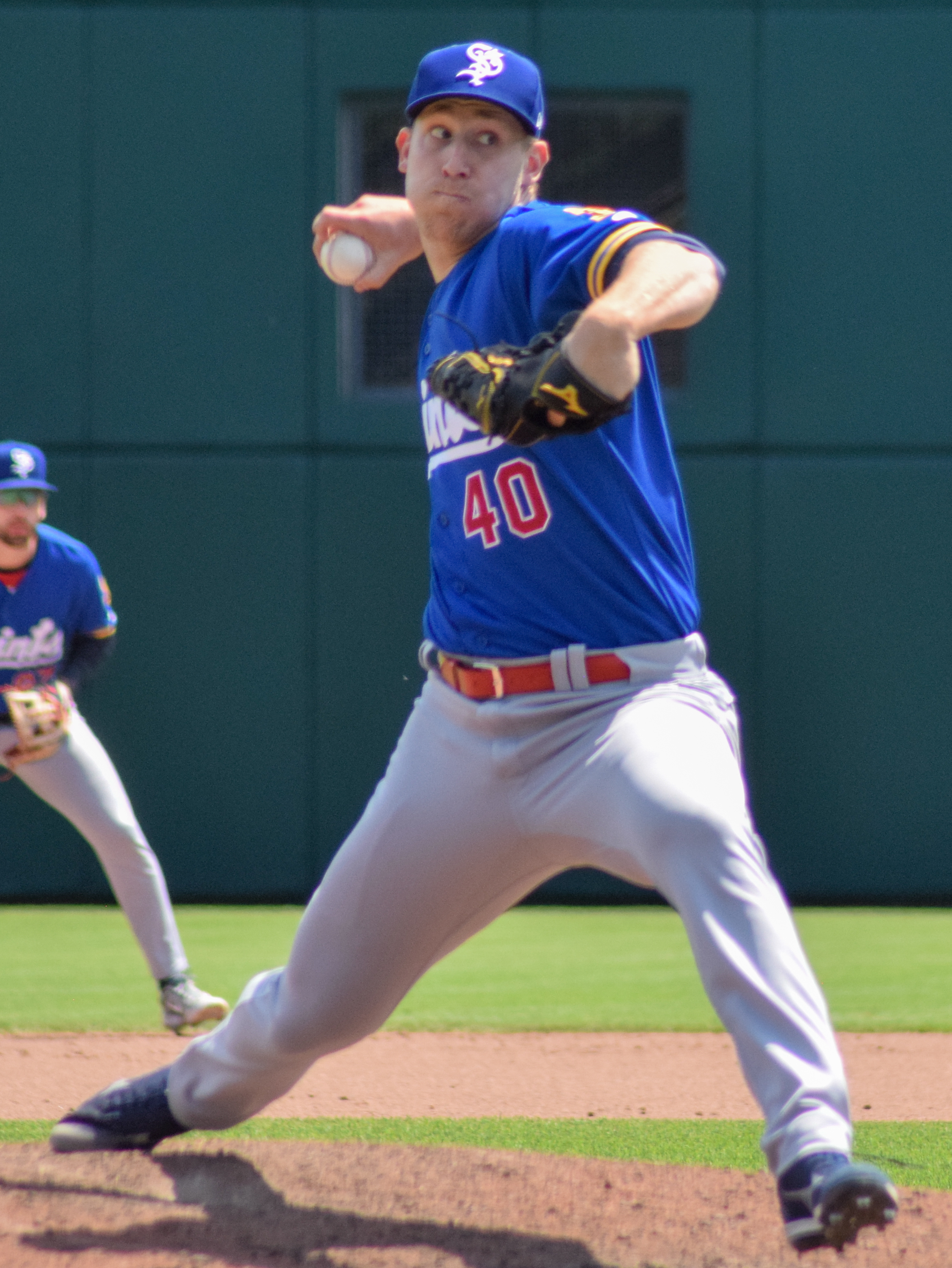
- Winder with the St. Paul Saints in 2023

Philadelphia Phillies
- Pitcher
- Born: October 11, 1996 (age 30); Richmond, Virginia, U.S.
- Bats: Right Throws: Right

MLB debut
- April 12, 2022, for the Minnesota Twins

MLB statistics (through 2024 season)
- Win–loss record: 6–7
- Earned run average: 4.39
- Strikeouts: 85
- Stats at Baseball Reference

Teams
- Minnesota Twins (2022–2024)

Joshua Stewart Winder (born October 11, 1996) is an American professional baseball pitcher in the Philadelphia Phillies organization. He has previously played in Major League Baseball (MLB) for the Minnesota Twins. He made his MLB debut in 2022.

== High school and college ==
Winder attended James River High School in Midlothian, Virginia, and the Virginia Military Institute (VMI), where he played college baseball for the VMI Keydets.

== Professional career ==
=== Minnesota Twins ===
The Minnesota Twins drafted Winder in the seventh round, with the 214th overall selection, of the 2018 Major League Baseball draft.

Winder made his professional debut with the rookie-level Elizabethton Twins and played 2019 with the Cedar Rapids Kernels. He did not play in a game in 2020 due to the cancellation of the minor league season because of the COVID-19 pandemic. Winder started 2021 with the Wichita Wind Surge and was promoted to the St. Paul Saints during the season. In June 2021, Winder was selected to play in the All-Star Futures Game. Over 14 starts between the two teams, Winder went 4–0 with a 2.63 ERA and 80 strikeouts over 72 innings. On November 19, 2021, the Twins added Winder to their 40-man roster to protect him from the Rule 5 draft.

Winder made the Twins' Opening Day roster in 2022, and made his MLB debut on April 12, 2022, tossing an inning of one–run ball against the Los Angeles Dodgers. He made 15 appearances (11 starts) for Minnesota in his rookie campaign, compiling a 4–6 record and 4.70 ERA with 47 strikeouts across 67 innings pitched. Winder made 19 appearances for Minnesota in 2023. Pitching primarily out of the bullpen, he recorded a 4.15 ERA with 28 strikeouts and one save across 34 2/3 innings of work.

Winder was placed on the 60–day injured list to begin the 2024 season as a result of a right scapula stress fracture sustained in late 2023. On May 27, 2024, he was activated from the injured list and optioned to the Triple–A. Winder made 4 appearances for Minnesota in 2024, posting a 3.00 ERA with 10 strikeouts across 9 innings of work. On November 4, Winder was removed from the 40–man roster and sent outright to St. Paul. He elected free agency the same day.

=== Arizona Diamondbacks ===
On January 23, 2025, Winder signed a minor league contract with the Arizona Diamondbacks. On February 27, it was announced that Winder would require Tommy John surgery and miss the entirety of the 2025 season. He was released by the Diamondbacks organization on March 28.

=== Philadelphia Phillies ===
On September 1, 2026, Winder signed a two-year minor league contract with the Philadelphia Phillies. He did not appear in a game in 2026 while recovering from Tommy John Surgery.
