= Jermaine Palacios =

Venezuelan baseball player (born 1996)

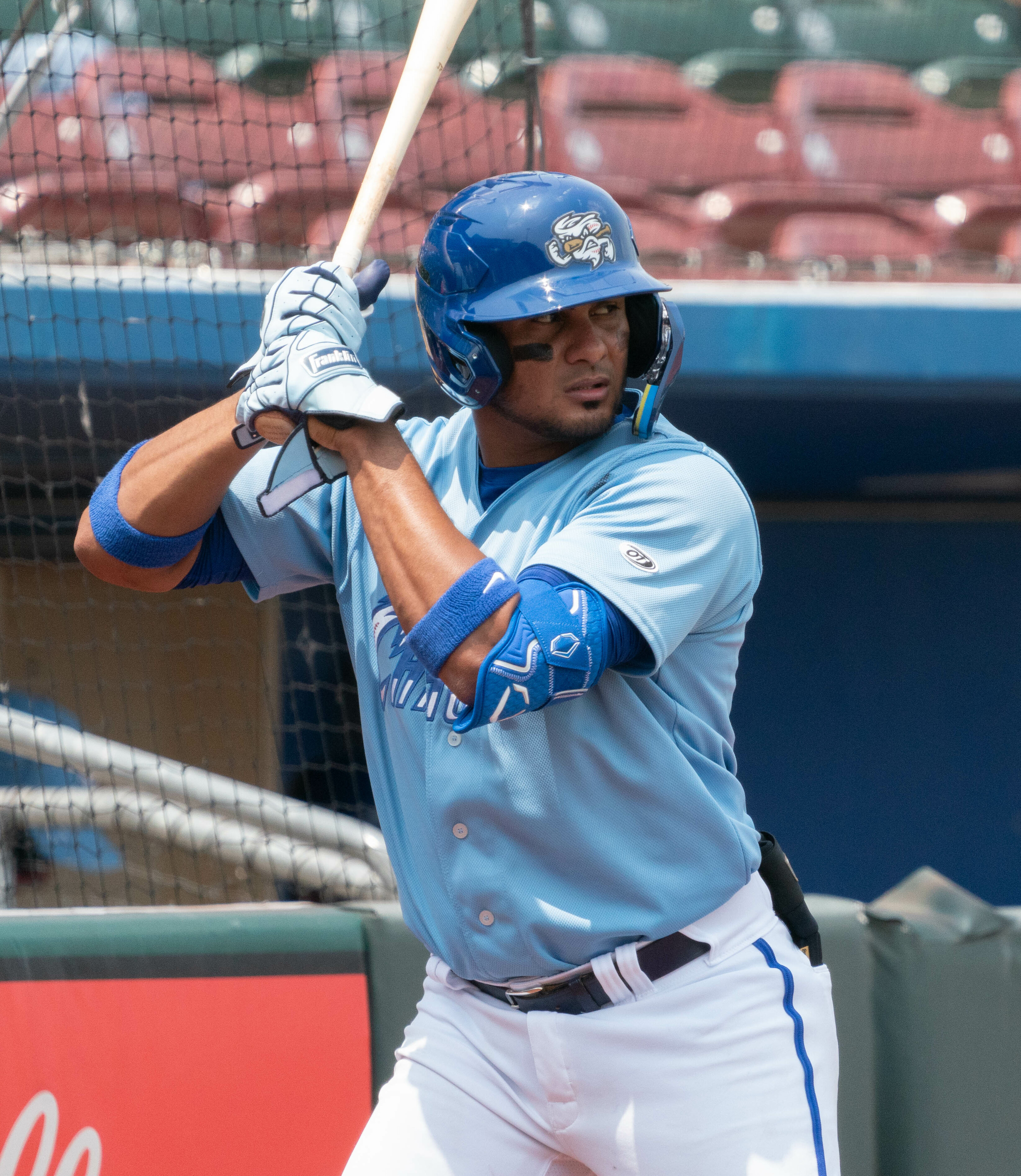
- Palacios with the Omaha Storm Chasers in 2023

Bravos de León – No. 3
- Shortstop
- Born: July 19, 1996 (age 29); Barquisimeto, Venezuela
- Bats: Right Throws: Right

MLB debut
- May 31, 2022, for the Minnesota Twins

MLB statistics (through 2022 season)
- Batting average: .143
- Home runs: 2
- Runs batted in: 6
- Stats at Baseball Reference

Teams
- Minnesota Twins (2022)

Jermaine Manuel Palacios Leon (born July 19, 1996) is a Venezuelan professional baseball infielder for the Bravos de León of the Mexican League. He has previously played in Major League Baseball (MLB) for the Minnesota Twins.

== Career ==
=== Minnesota Twins ===
Palacios signed as an international free agent with the Minnesota Twins organization in 2014 and made his debut that same year, for the DSL Twins, where he spent the whole season, posting a .270 batting average with 29 RBIs and 14 stolen bases in 49 games. In 2015, he played for both the GCL Twins and the rookie-level Elizabethton Twins, posting a combined .370 batting average with three home runs and 37 RBIs in 57 total games between both teams. He spent 2016 with the Single-A Cedar Rapids Kernals where he batted .222 with one home run and 28 RBIs in 71 games. He began the 2017 season back with Cedar Rapids, and after batting .320 with 11 home runs and 39 RBIs in 62 games, was promoted to the High-A Fort Myers Miracle where he finished the season with a .269 batting average with two home runs and 28 RBIs in another 62 games.

=== Tampa Bay Rays ===
On February 18, 2018, the Twins traded Palacios to the Tampa Bay Rays for Jake Odorizzi. He began 2018 with the Double-A Montgomery Biscuits but was reassigned to the High-A Charlotte Stone Crabs during the season. In 118 total games between the two teams, he hit .217 with two home runs and 53 RBIs.

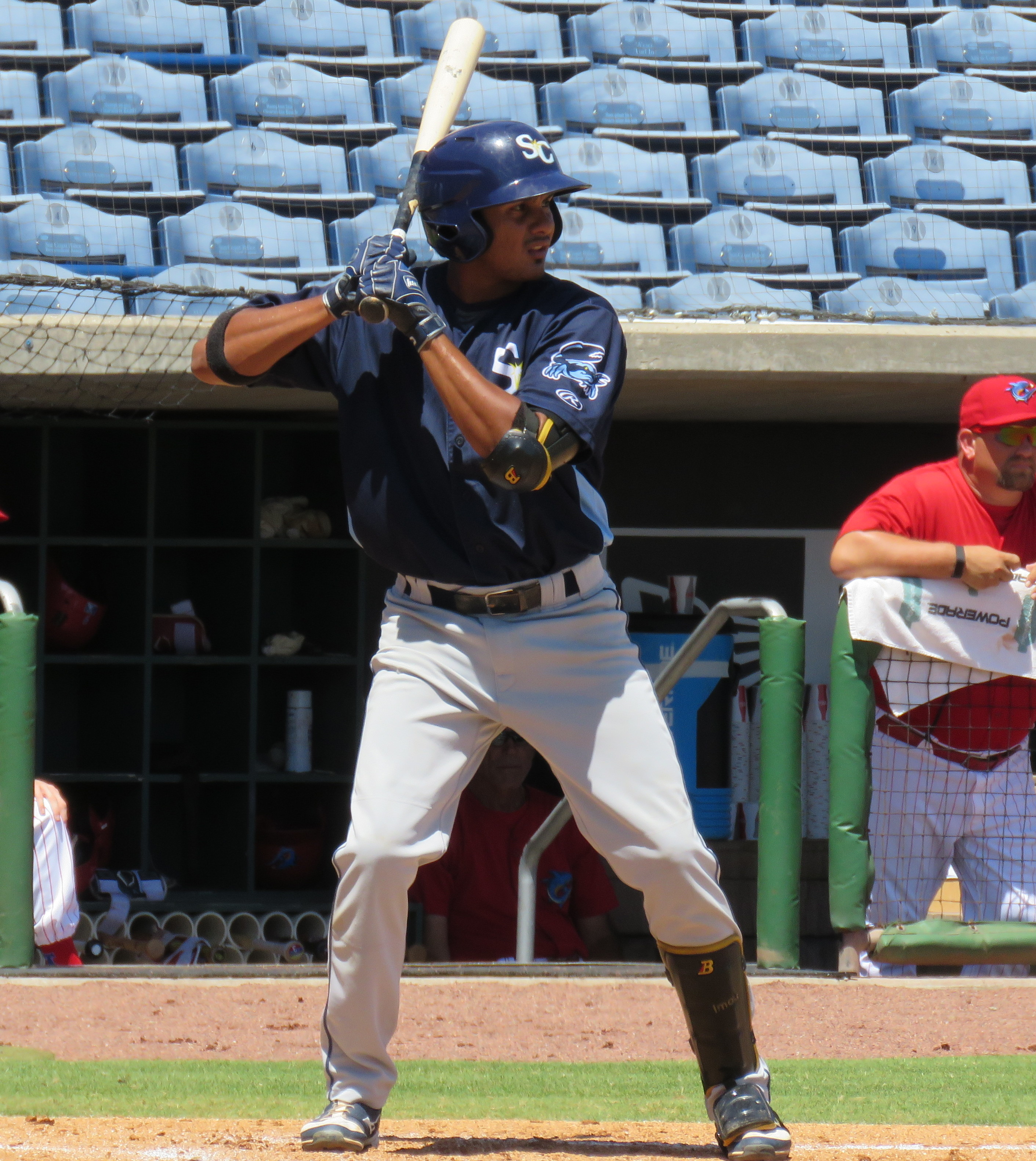
Palacios with the Charlotte Stone Crabs

Palacios began the 2019 season with Montgomery. In 75 games split between the Biscuits and High-A Charlotte, he hit .210/.275/.266 with 2 home runs, 26 RBI, and 9 stolen bases. Palacios did not play in a game in 2020 due to the cancellation of the minor league season because of the COVID-19 pandemic. Palacios elected free agency following the season on November 2, 2020.

=== Minnesota Twins (second stint) ===
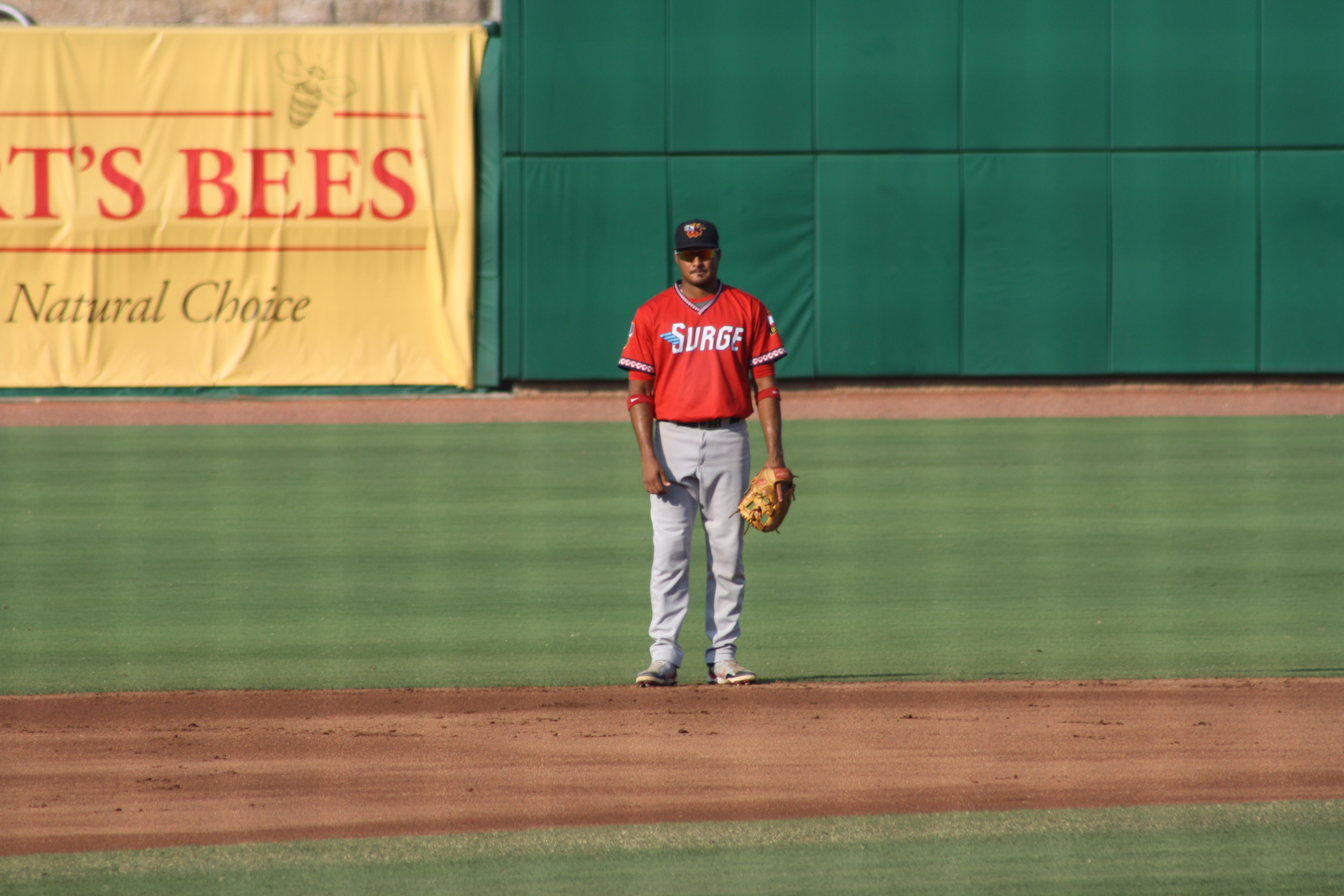
Palacios with the Wichita Wind Surge

On February 15, 2021, Palacios signed a minor league contract with the Minnesota Twins organization. He began the 2022 season with the Triple-A St. Paul Saints.

The Twins promoted him to the major leagues on May 31, 2022, and he made his major league debut that day. The Twins returned him to St. Paul on June 8, and promoted him back to the major leagues on September 3. That day, he entered a blowout loss against the Chicago White Sox, and recorded his first career pitching strikeout against Chicago outfielder Adam Haseley. On October 4, Palacios hit his first career home run, a solo shot off of José Ruiz of the Chicago White Sox.

=== Detroit Tigers ===
Palacios was claimed off waivers by the Detroit Tigers on October 12, 2022. On November 10, Palacios was removed from the 40-man roster and sent outright to Triple–A; he subsequently elected free agency the same day.

On November 29, 2022, Palacios re–signed with the Tigers a minor league contract. He was assigned to the Triple–A Toledo Mud Hens to begin the 2023 season, where he played in 36 games and hit .176/.232/.352 with 6 home runs and 21 RBI. Palacios was released by the Tigers organization on June 8, 2023.

=== Kansas City Royals ===
On June 12, 2023, Palacios signed a minor league contract with the Kansas City Royals organization. In 16 games for the Triple–A Omaha Storm Chasers, he hit .200/.220/.418 with 3 home runs and 8 RBI. On August 3, Palacios was released by Kansas City.

=== Sultanes de Monterrey ===
On January 30, 2024, Palacios signed with the Sultanes de Monterrey of the Mexican League. In 68 games for Monterrey, he batted .300/.337/.420 with four home runs, 29 RBI, and three stolen bases.

=== Bravos de León ===
On February 25, 2025, Palacios and Jorge Rondón were traded to the Bravos de León in exchange for Gustavo Núñez. In 56 games he hit .274/.342/.493 with 10 home runs, 30 RBIs and 8 stolen bases.
