= Miguel Sanó =

Dominican baseball player (born 1993)

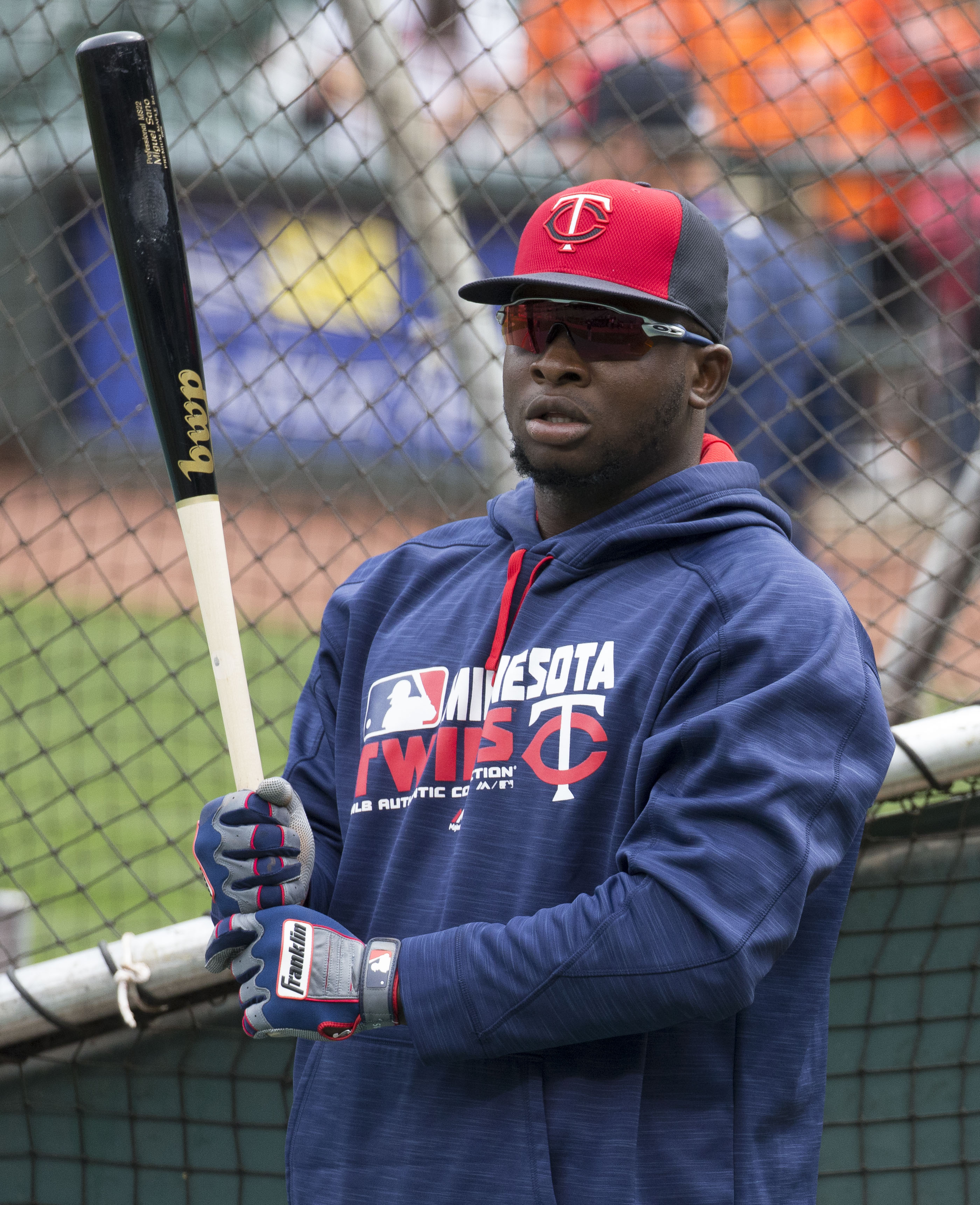
- Sanó in April 2016

Chunichi Dragons – No. 23
- Third baseman / First baseman
- Born: May 11, 1993 (age 33); San Pedro de Macorís, Dominican Republic
- Bats: Right Throws: Right

Professional debut
- MLB: July 2, 2015, for the Minnesota Twins
- NPB: March 27, 2026, for the Chunichi Dragons

MLB statistics (through 2024 season)
- Batting average: .233
- Home runs: 164
- Runs batted in: 424

NPB statistics (through August 18, 2026)
- Batting average: .221
- Home runs: 17
- Runs batted in: 36
- Stats at Baseball Reference

Teams
- Minnesota Twins (2015–2022); Los Angeles Angels (2024); Chunichi Dragons (2026–present)

Career highlights and awards
- All-Star (2017)

Miguel Ángel Jean Sanó (born May 11, 1993) is a Dominican professional baseball first baseman and third baseman for the Chunichi Dragons of Nippon Professional Baseball (NPB). He has previously played in Major League Baseball (MLB) for the Minnesota Twins and Los Angeles Angels. He made his MLB debut in 2015, and was an All-Star in 2017. He is currently playing winter baseball for the Estrellas Orientales of the Dominican Professional Baseball League.

== Early life ==
Miguel Sanó was born in San Pedro de Macorís, Dominican Republic, to a poor Haitian family. He chose to play baseball with the name Sanó, his mother's family name, rather than his father's, which is Jean, out of respect to the Dominican Republic. He was discovered at a young age, and worked with scouts to develop his talent. In early 2009, Major League Baseball conducted an age investigation, a prerequisite for every player signed in Latin America, that confirmed Sanó's identity but could not verify his exact age. Sanó claimed to be 16 years old, but there had been rumors in the Dominican Republic that he was older.

Twins then-general manager Bill Smith said, "Sanó's age and identity have probably been scrutinized more than any player in the history of the Dominican Republic," and the issues and difficulties involved caused Sanó to lower his asking price from the $5–6 million bonus he was seeking when the international signing period first opened.

The Pittsburgh Pirates were the first team to offer Sanó a deal and appeared to be his most ardent suitor, but negotiations were at a standstill after agent Rob Plummer rejected a $2.6 million offer from the team, proffered on their behalf by their Director of Latin American Scouting, Rene Gayo. Besides the Pirates, the Cleveland Indians also expressed interest, and had him come to their academy in the Dominican Republic for a workout session. The Baltimore Orioles pursued Sanó for a short time, but believed his value was well below his $3 million price tag. Other interested teams included the New York Yankees and the Boston Red Sox.

On September 29, 2009, Sanó said he would sign a Major League Baseball contract with the Minnesota Twins, which included a $3.15 million signing bonus. The bonus was the largest for a Latin American player from outside of Cuba in 2009, and the second highest bonus ever for a Dominican amateur, second only to the $4.25 million the Oakland Athletics paid right-handed pitcher Michael Ynoa in 2008. It was also the highest international signing bonus in Twins history, more than the Twins spent on 70 international prospects from 2006 to 2008 combined. Sanó's deal surpassed the $3 million the Yankees gave catcher Gary Sánchez. The contract was contingent upon Sanó receiving a visa from the United States. On October 20, 2009, Sports Illustrated reported that Sanó had been issued a work visa by the United States, clearing him to play professional baseball; this was confirmed by the Twins on December 5.

Sanó is one of the subjects of the 2012 documentary Ballplayer: Pelotero. The film follows Sanó through his controversial signing period in 2009. The film is directed by Jonathan Paley, Ross Finkel, and Trevor Martin, narrated by John Leguizamo, and produced by Bobby Valentine. It premiered at the Hamptons International Film Festival in 2011 and had a theatrical release in theaters in New York, Los Angeles, and Minneapolis in July 2012. The film was screened from July 13–19 in Minneapolis by the Film Society of Minneapolis/St. Paul in the St. Anthony Main Theater.

== Professional career ==
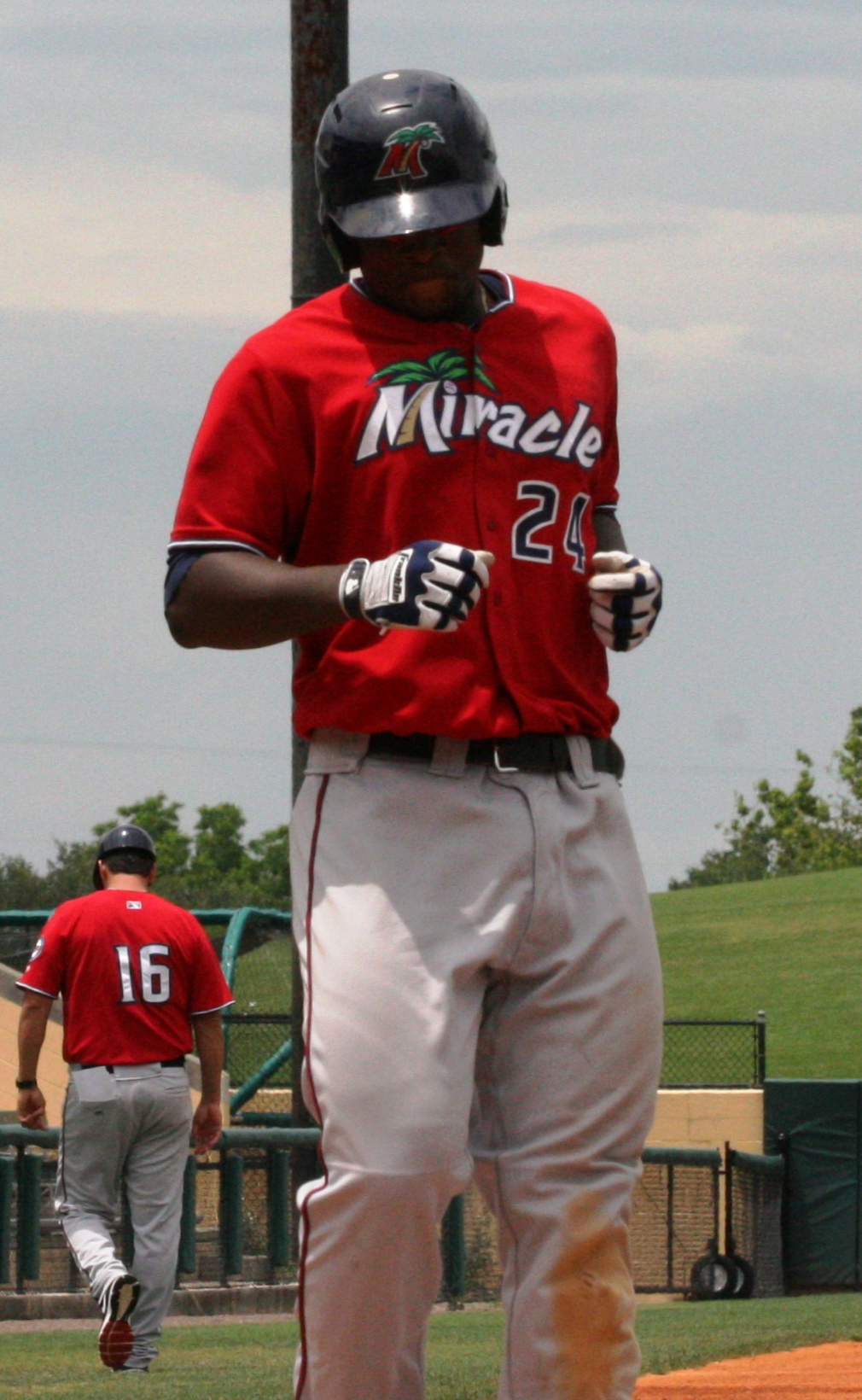
Sanó with the Fort Myers Miracle in 2013

=== Minor leagues ===
Before the 2011 season, Baseball America rated Sanó the third-best prospect in the Twins' minor league system. Sanó spent 2011 playing third base and shortstop for the Elizabethton Twins, the Twins affiliate in the Appalachian League, hitting .292 with 20 HR and 59 RBI. After the 2011 season Baseball America rated him the top prospect in the Appalachian League, the 18th-best prospect in all of baseball, and (agreeing with Baseball Prospectus) the top Twins prospect.

Sanó spent 2012 with the Class-A Beloit Snappers of the Midwest League, transitioning fully to third base. Meanwhile, general manager Terry Ryan said that the team hoped to move Sanó closer to the major leagues quickly. Still, his developing defense and propensity for striking out had the Twins making sure not to rush his path through the minors. Sanó hit .258 with a .373 OBP, and led the Midwest League with 28 HR and 100 RBI. After the 2012 season, Baseball America rated Sanó the second-best prospect in the Midwest League and the top Twins prospect, and Baseball Prospectus rated him the second-best Twins prospect. MLB.com rated him the 12th-best prospect in the game, as well as the top third-base prospect.

Sanó began the 2013 season with the Fort Myers Miracle of the Class A-Advanced Florida State League. On June 9, 2013, Sanó and Eddie Rosario were promoted to the New Britain Rock Cats of the Class AA Eastern League. Sanó compiled 35 home runs, 103 RBI, and a .280 batting average. At the end of the 2013 season, MLB.com ranked him the third-best prospect in the league, and second in the Twins organization, behind only Byron Buxton. The Twins invited Sanó to spring training in 2014. During spring training he tore his ulnar collateral ligament and required Tommy John surgery. He missed the 2014 season in recovery. Sanó began the 2015 season with the Chattanooga Lookouts of the Class AA Southern League, and batted .274 with 15 home runs and 48 RBIs through the end of June.

=== Minnesota Twins ===
Sanó made his major league debut on July 2, 2015, and went 1-for-4. He had his first RBI on July 3. His first home run came on July 7 against Kevin Gausman. He was named AL Rookie of the Month for August 2015. Sanó finished third in the 2015 AL Rookie of the Year voting, behind winner Carlos Correa and runner-up Francisco Lindor.

The Twins moved Sanó to right field before the 2016 season, after signing Byung Ho Park to be the designated hitter and retaining incumbent third baseman Trevor Plouffe. A hamstring strain sent Sanó to the injured list on June 1. The Twins moved Sanó back to his natural position of third base when he returned to the team a month later. He finished the 2016 season batting .236 with 25 home runs and 66 RBI over 116 games.

On Opening Day in 2017, Sanó homered and drew a bases loaded walk against the Kansas City Royals, helping the Twins snap an eight-game Opening Day losing streak. He was named an MLB All-Star in 2017, and finished as the runner-up to Aaron Judge in the Home Run Derby. During the All-Star Game, Sanó had an RBI single against Alex Wood. He finished the 2017 season with 28 home runs and 77 RBI. The Twins made the postseason for the first time since 2010, but Sanó was left off the playoff roster with a shin injury.

After a slow start to the 2018 season, Sanó was demoted to Fort Myers on June 14. He was batting just .203 with a .270 on-base percentage at the time of his demotion. He rejoined the Twins on July 28 after Eduardo Escobar was traded to the Arizona Diamondbacks. Sanó finished the season batting .199 with 13 home runs and 41 RBI in 71 games.

Sanó began the 2019 season on the injured list after having surgery on his Achilles during spring training. He made his season debut against the Seattle Mariners on May 16, hitting two doubles and driving in a run. Sanó launched a pinch hit walk-off home run against the Atlanta Braves on August 5. He finished the 2019 season with a career high 34 home runs, and the Twins won their first AL Central title since 2010. Sanó hit his first career postseason home run in game one of the 2019 ALDS.

Sanó signed a three-year, $30 million contract with the Twins on January 14, 2020. The contract included a team option for the 2023 season. The Twins moved Sanó to first base after signing free agent third baseman Josh Donaldson in the offseason. Sanó hit .204 with 13 home runs and 25 RBI during the COVID shortened 2020 season. He had the most strikeouts in the league, with an astonishing 90 strikeouts in 186 at-bats.

Sanó batted .223 with 30 home runs and 75 RBI during the 2021 season. This made him the ninth player in Twins history to have multiple 30 home run seasons with the club.

A sacrifice fly from Sanó provided the game's only RBI during a 1–0 win over the Kansas City Royals on April 21. He delivered a walk-off single against the Detroit Tigers on April 26.

Sanó was placed on the injured list with a torn meniscus in his left knee on May 3. He briefly returned on July 25, but was placed on the injured list again less than a week later. Sanó played in just 20 games during the 2022 season, batting .083 with one home run. The Twins declined Sanó's contract option for the 2023 season on November 7, making him a free agent.

On February 7, 2023, Sanó hosted a free agent workout for interested teams. However, he did not find a contract, and instead returned to the Dominican Republic, saying he would play winter ball.

=== Los Angeles Angels ===
On January 23, 2024, Sanó signed a minor league contract with the Los Angeles Angels. On March 26, it was announced that Sanó had made the Angels' Opening Day roster. In 28 games for the Angels, he batted .205/.295/.313 with two home runs and six RBI. On July 8, Sanó was designated for assignment by Los Angeles. He was released by the Angels organization on July 13.

=== Chunichi Dragons ===
On December 15, 2025, Sanó signed a one-year contract with the Chunichi Dragons of Nippon Professional Baseball.

== Personal life ==
Sanó and his wife, Daniela, had a daughter named Angelica in 2014. She died of a heart defect one week after she was born. In 2016, they had a son.

On December 29, 2017, a Twin Cities photographer accused Sanó of sexually assaulting her in 2015 after an autograph session. Sanó denied the allegation. MLB investigated the claim and chose not to suspend him.

On February 12, 2023, Sano's biological father, Ricardo Aponte, allegedly killed his own girlfriend, Yajaira Henderson, in San Pedro de Macorís, in an incident captured by a surveillance camera.
