= Jovani Morán =

Puerto Rican baseball player (born 1997)

Boston Red Sox – No. 47
- Pitcher
- Born: April 24, 1997 (age 29); Mayaguez, Puerto Rico
- Bats: Left Throws: Left

MLB debut
- September 12, 2021, for the Minnesota Twins

MLB statistics (through 2026 season)
- Win–loss record: 4–6
- Earned run average: 3.81
- Strikeouts: 190
- Stats at Baseball Reference

Teams
- Minnesota Twins (2021–2023); Boston Red Sox (2025–present)

Jovani Morán (born April 24, 1997) is a Puerto Rican professional baseball pitcher for the Boston Red Sox of Major League Baseball (MLB). He has previously played in MLB for the Minnesota Twins.

== Career ==
=== Minnesota Twins ===
Morán was drafted by the Minnesota Twins in the seventh round of the 2015 Major League Baseball draft out of the Carlos Beltran Baseball Academy in Florida, Puerto Rico. He made his professional debut that year with the rookie–level Gulf Coast League Twins.

After missing 2016 due to injury, Morán played 2017 with the rookie–level Elizabethton Twins. He spent 2018 with the Single–A Cedar Rapids Kernels and High–A Fort Myers Miracle and 2019 with the Double–A Pensacola Blue Wahoos and GCL Twins. After the 2019 season, he played in the Arizona Fall League. Morán did not play in a game in 2020 due to the cancellation of the minor league season because of the COVID-19 pandemic.

Morán started 2021 with the Double–A Wichita Wind Surge before being promoted to the Triple–A St. Paul Saints. The Twins promoted him to the major leagues on September 12, and he made his MLB debut that night. Morán appeared in 5 games during his rookie campaign, recording a 7.88 ERA with 10 strikeouts over eight innings.

Morán made 31 appearances out of the bullpen for Minnesota during the 2022 campaign, accumulating an 0-1 record and 2.21 ERA with 54 strikeouts and 1 saves across 40 2/3 innings pitched.

In 2023, Morán made 43 appearances for Minnesota, logging a 5.31 ERA with 48 strikeouts in 42 1/3 innings pitched. On September 1, 2023, Morán was placed on the injured list with a left forearm strain. He was transferred to the 60–day injured list on September 24, ending his season. Following the season, it was announced that Morán would undergo Tommy John surgery and miss the entirety of the 2024 season. On November 17, Morán was non–tendered by Minnesota and became a free agent. Moran re-signed with the Twins on a minor league contract on November 20.

=== Boston Red Sox ===
On December 24, 2024, Morán was traded to the Boston Red Sox in exchange for Mickey Gasper. After a rehab stint, Morán was assigned to the Triple-A Worcester Red Sox, where he was able to rekindle past success. On August 11, 2025, Morán's contract was selected to join the big league club, returning the major leagues after nearly two years. Moran made his Red Sox debut on August 12, pitching two innings against the Houston Astros, giving up an earned run and striking out two. Morán was sent back to Triple-A Worcester on August 19.
