= Jhon Romero =

Colombian baseball player (born 1995)

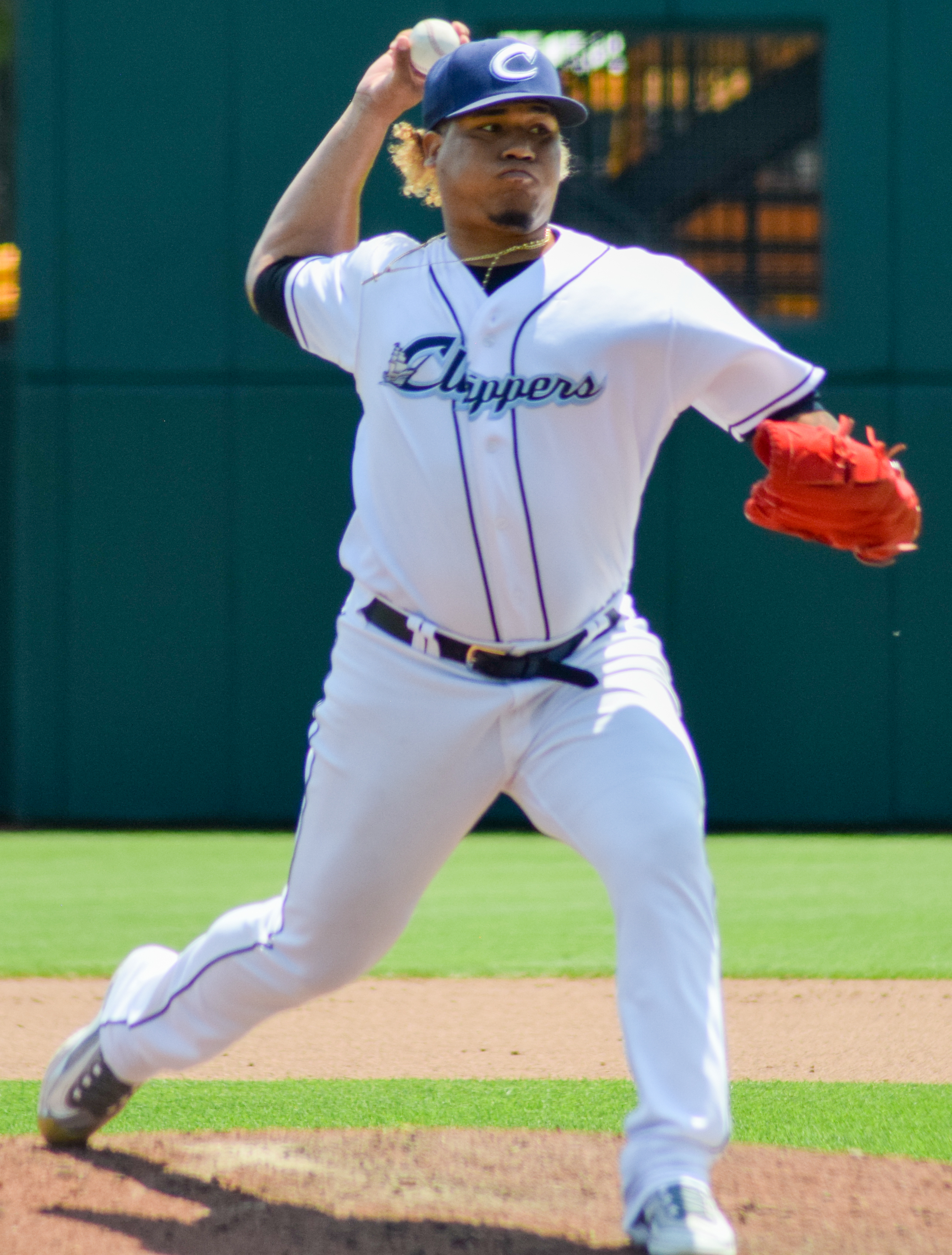
- Romero with the Columbus Clippers in 2023

Centauros de La Guaira – No. 73
- Relief pitcher
- Born: January 17, 1995 (age 31); Cartagena, Colombia
- Bats: Right Throws: Right

MLB debut
- September 24, 2021, for the Washington Nationals

MLB statistics (through 2022 season)
- Win–loss record: 0–0
- Earned run average: 4.00
- Strikeouts: 9
- Stats at Baseball Reference

Teams
- Washington Nationals (2021); Minnesota Twins (2022)
Medals
Men's baseball
Representing Colombia
Bolivarian Games
| Gold medal – first place | 2017 Santa Marta | Team |

Jhon Jairo Romero (born January 17, 1995) is a Colombian professional baseball pitcher for the Centauros de La Guaira of the Venezuelan Major League. He has previously played in Major League Baseball (MLB) for the Washington Nationals and Minnesota Twins.

== Career ==
=== Chicago Cubs ===
As a boy, Romero played catcher, but he began finding success as a pitcher as he matured. Older than most international amateurs when he joined a professional baseball organization, Romero was 20 years old when the Chicago Cubs signed him out of Colombia in 2015 and assigned him to their Dominican Summer League affiliate. At the time, Cubs scout Manuel Esquivia said the organization envisioned him as a possible future closer, as he touched 94 miles per hour (151 km/h) in his tryout with the Chicago organization.

After spending two seasons in the Dominican Summer League, Romero was assigned to the Cubs' stateside affiliates in the 2017 season and shot through the low minors, rising from the Arizona League Cubs to the short-season Eugene Emeralds of the Northwest League before finishing out the season with the South Bend Cubs of the Midwest League. He led Cubs relief prospects with a 0.86 ERA and led all minor league pitchers who pitched at least 25 innings with a 0.62 WHIP that year, across the three levels.

Promoted to the Myrtle Beach Pelicans in the Advanced-A Carolina League to begin the 2018 season, Romero posted a 3.27 ERA and 1.30 WHIP over 32 appearances through July.

=== Washington Nationals ===
Hours before the Major League Baseball trade deadline on July 31, 2018, the Cubs traded Romero to the Washington Nationals for Brandon Kintzler. Although effective finishing out the year with the Potomac Nationals, Washington's High-A affiliate, Romero struggled in 2019 and was ultimately diagnosed with a torn ulnar collateral ligament of the elbow in his right throwing arm. He underwent Tommy John surgery to replace the damaged ligament, missing the remainder of the 2019 season and not playing in 2020 due to the COVID-19 pandemic.

In the minor leagues in 2021, Romero advanced from the Double-A Harrisburg Senators to the Triple-A Rochester Red Wings. Across those two levels, he put up a 2.62 ERA while appearing in 38 games, all of them as a reliever. On September 23, 2021, the Nationals selected Romero's contract from Rochester and promoted him to the major leagues for the first time. Romero made his major league debut the following day against the Cincinnati Reds, pitching a scoreless inning of relief.

On March 17, 2022, Romero was designated for assignment by the Nationals after the signing of Nelson Cruz was made official.

=== Minnesota Twins ===
On March 21, 2022, Romero was claimed off waivers by the Minnesota Twins. He made 4 appearances for the big-league club, recording a 3.60 ERA with 6 strikeouts in 5.0 innings pitched. On May 11, Romero was placed on the 60-day injured list with right biceps inflammation. He would miss the remainder of the season with the injury. On October 12, Romero was removed from the 40-man roster and sent outright to the Triple–A St. Paul Saints after clearing waivers. He elected free agency following the season on November 10.

=== Cleveland Guardians ===
On March 20, 2023, Romero signed a minor league contract with the Cleveland Guardians organization. In 34 games for the Triple–A Columbus Clippers, he logged a 4.28 ERA with 56 strikeouts and 1 save in 48 1/3 innings pitched. On August 3, Romero was placed on the injured list with right elbow soreness. He was released by the Guardians on August 8.

=== Leones de Yucatán ===
On March 8, 2024, Romero signed with the Leones de Yucatán of the Mexican League. In 22 games, he logged a 3.38 ERA with 27 strikeouts and 4 saves across 21 1/3 innings of relief.

=== Rieleros de Aguascalientes ===
On June 21, 2024, Romero was traded to the Rieleros de Aguascalientes of the Mexican League. In 16 games for Aguascalientes, he posted a 4–2 record and 5.60 ERA with 18 strikeouts and 3 saves across 17 2/3 innings pitched. Romero was released by the Rieleros on January 16, 2025.

=== Tecolotes de los Dos Laredos ===
On May 9, 2025, Romero signed with the Tecolotes de los Dos Laredos of the Mexican League. In nine appearances for Dos Laredos, he logged a 2-0 record and 6.75 with 10 strikeouts across eight innings of work. Romero was released by the Tecolotes on June 1.

=== Conspiradores de Querétaro ===
On June 6, 2025, Romero was claimed off waivers by the Conspiradores de Querétaro of the Mexican League. In seven appearances for Querétaro, he recorded a 5.68 ERA with seven strikeouts across 6 1/3 innings pitched. Romero was released by the Conspiradores on July 4.

=== Centauros de La Guaira ===
On April 11, 2026, Romero signed with the Centauros de La Guaira of the Venezuelan Major League. In 25 games he threw 22.2 innings going 2-0 with a 3.97 ERA and 23 strikeouts.
