= Mankato Habaneros =

Softball team in Minnesota, United States

Information
- League: Northwoods League
- Location: Mankato, Minnesota
- Ballpark: ISG Field
- Founded: 2024
- League championships: (1) 2024
- Colors: Dark green, light green, orange, red
- Ownership: Chris Goodell and Ben Kapanke
- President: Chris Goodell
- Website: northwoodsleague.com/mankato-habaneros

The Mankato Habaneros are a fastpitch softball team that plays in the softball branch of the collegiate summer Northwoods League, also known as Northwoods League Softball (NWLS). The Habaneros play their home games at ISG Field in Mankato, Minnesota.The team shares the ballpark with the NWL's Mankato MoonDogs, with field modifications made for conversion between softball and baseball.

== History ==
=== Background ===
In May 2023, the Northwoods League announced that they were creating a summer collegiate softball league to begin play in 2024. Explaining the rationale, co-founder Kathy Radatz said “We have seen tremendous growth in interest in women’s softball in recent years, and we are excited to be able to provide a platform for female athletes to continue to hone their skills and compete at a high level during the summer months.” Mankato was announced as one of the four initial host cities for NWLS, alongside Madison, Wisconsin; La Crosse, Wisconsin; and Minot, North Dakota.

In January 2024, Mankato team official announced the Habaneros name and unveiled their branding. Their green and orange colors were chosen to reflect the colors of the habanero pepper, and the team announced plans to change team colors as the season progresses, "mirroring the ripening process of the habanero pepper itself." The primary logo features an anthropomorphic pepper in a softball pitching windup.

=== 2024 season ===
In 2024, Mankato joined with the Madison Night Mares, La Crosse Steam, and Minot Honeybees in the inaugural season of the upstart softball league. The Habaneros finished the 2024 season with a record of 31–11, best in the NWLS and meriting the softball circuit's first ever championship.

The 2024 season featured several breakout performances by individual Habaneros. Paige Zender was named NWLS Player of the Year after leading the league in numerous statistical categories and winning the Triple Crown. In 40 games (127 at-bats), she batted .417 with a 1.404 OPS. Additionally, she led the league in home runs (15), RBI (60), and tied for the league lead in walks (29). Amity White of the Habaneros set an individual NWLS record with 27 stolen bases in the regular season and also led the league with 48 runs scored in 2024. Pitcher Jayme Scheck led the league in wins with 12. Lastly, Coley Ries Welter was named Coach of the Year after leading the Habaneros to the league title.

=== 2025 season ===
In 2025, NWLS expanded to five teams with the addition of Wausau. The Habaneros finished the season with a record of 20-22 (.476), narrowly missing the first ever NWLS playoff series. One standout performance was pitcher Alexis Michon, who finished with a 2.44 ERA and led all NWLS pitchers with a .92 WHIP.

=== 2026 season ===
In 2026, NWLS expanded to six teams with the addition of Grand Forks. The Habaneros finished the season with a 14-28 (.333) record, better only than Minot and well out of playoff qualification. One standout player was infielder Katy Olive, who earned a place on the post-season All-Star team after batting .397 and leading the league in triples.

== Player highlights ==
=== Full-season All-Stars ===
The following Habaneros have been selected as NWLS Post-Season All Stars, honoring their performance over the course of the full softball season.

Year	Player	Pos.	College
2024	Sailor Hall	OF	Minnesota State
2024	Amity White	OF	South Alabama
2024	Paige Zender	UTL	Iowa State
2024	Jessa Snippes	UTL	Minnesota
2024	Jayme Scheck	P	Drake
2025	Alexis Michon	P	Trine
2026	Katy Olive	2B	Miami of Ohio
2026	Olivia Pichardo	OF	Cal
2026	Ava Parent	OF	Wisconsin
2026	Kylinn Stangl	P	Minnesota

=== Awards ===
- NWLS Player of the Year - Paige Zender (2024)

=== NWLS single-season records ===
The following all-time NWLS single season records are held by Habaneros as of the end of the 2026 season:

	Stat	Player	#	Season
Hitting	RBI	Paige Zender	60	2024
Hitting	Stolen bases	Amity White	27	2024
Hitting	Triples	Katy Olive	5 (tie)	2026
Pitching	Wins	Jayme Scheck	12	2024
Pitching	WHIP	Alexis Michon	.92	2025

Hitting rate stat qualifiers require minimum of 2.00 plate appearances per team game. Pitching rate stat qualifiers require minimum of 1.00 innings pitched per team game. Cumulative stats include all NWLS players in a given season.
