= 2025 Northwoods League season =

32rd annual season of the Northwoods League

- League: Northwoods League
- Sport: Baseball; Fastpitch softball
- Duration: May 26 – August 9 (Baseball playoffs: August 10 – August 14)
- Games: Baseball: ~851; Softball: ~104
- Teams: Baseball: 24; Softball: 5

Northwoods League Championship
- Champions: Green Bay Rockers (baseball); Madison Night Mares (softball)
- Runners-up: Duluth Huskies (baseball); Minot Honeybees (softball)

Seasons
- ← 2024 2026 →

The 2025 Northwoods League season was the 32nd season of baseball and 2nd season of softball in the Northwoods League, a collegiate summer baseball and softball organization. The season concluded in August with the Green Bay Rockers winning the baseball championship and the Madison Night Mares winning the softball championship.

== Baseball season overview ==
=== Background ===
In 2025, there were 24 Northwoods League baseball teams, split evenly between the Great Lakes and Great Plains Divisions. These divisions were then split up between the Great Lakes East, Great Lakes West, Great Plains East, and Great Plains West subdivisions. The Kalamazoo Growlers entered the season as defending champions, having defeated the La Crosse Loggers in a 14-inning walk-off victory in the league's 2024 championship game.

There were some franchise shifts moving from the 2024 to the 2025 season. The Kokomo Jackrabbits ceased operations after a legal battle between Jackrabbits ownership and the city of Kokomo. The league also chose to deactivate the Minnesota Mud Puppies after the 2024 season. The Mud Puppies had been created in 2021 as a travel-only team to help offset schedule disruptions caused by Covid-19 border restrictions that prevented the Thunder Bay Border Cats from participating that season. The Mud Puppies had continued to play in the NWL through 2024 despite the Border Cats' return in 2022, but were not a part of the 2025 season. They did return in 2026.

=== Season ===
The regular season began on May 26, with the season split into two halves, and the top two teams in each sub-division--the standings leader from each half--qualified for the playoffs. The first half sub-division winners were the Traverse City Pit Spitters (Great Lakes East), Green Bay Rockers (Great Lakes West), La Crosse Loggers (Great Plains East), and St. Cloud Rox (Great Plains West).

In the second half of the season, the Pit Spitters also had the best record in the Great Lakes East, so a playoff berth was awarded to the team with the next best overall season record, the Kalamazoo Growlers. Second half victors in the other sub-divisions were the Wausau Woodchucks (Great Lakes West), Duluth Huskies (Great Plains East), and Mankato MoonDogs (Great Plains West).

In the four best-of-three subdivision series, the Pit Spitters swept the Growlers, the Rockers swept the Woodchucks, the Huskies swept the Loggers, and the MoonDogs took 2 of 3 against the Rox. In the single-game Great Lakes Division championship, the Rockers defeated the Pit Spitters 10-5, and in the Great Plains, the Huskies defeated the MoonDogs 4-1.

The NWL Championship game was held at Wade Stadium in Duluth, Minnesota on 8/14/25. After three scoreless innings, the Rockers struck first on a two-run single by Jeremy Delamota. The Huskies answered back in the bottom of the frame with a solo home run from Ethan Surowiec and an RBI single by Reagan Reeder. The Rockers pushed two more across in the 5th, but the Huskies batted through the order in the bottom of the frame and carried a lead of 6-2 through the 7th. The Rockers chipped away, scoring one unanswered in the 7th and another 3 in the 8th, tying the game on a 3rd out sac fly from Joe Mennella. The score was tied 8-8 in the top of the 9th. With two outs, Green Bay DH Payton Mansfield hit a high infield popup. With the ball lost in the lights, neither Huskies first baseman Reagan Reeder nor second baseman Jake Downing had a good read on the ball. The two bumped each other as the ball came down, and Xaige Lancaster was able to score from third, taking the lead. Another run was added before turning the frame over to Duluth. Green Bay pitcher Drew Aguilar worked a clean inning and Green Bay won the game 10-8.

=== Individual achievements ===
Ethan Surowiec had an exceptional season for Duluth. A highly-touted 2024 prospect out of high school in Gulfport, Mississippi, Surowiec had only limited action as a freshman at Ole Miss. Making the most of his summer in the NWL, he appeared in 53 games with 204 at-bats, leading the league in home runs (17), RBI (68), and OPS (1.255). He was named to the mid-season all-star team, and hit a home run in his lone at-bat in the all-star game. In the midst of his breakout summer in the NWL, he entered the NCAA transfer portal and signed with the Florida Gators. After leading the Huskies to the NWL championship game, Surowiec was named 2025 NWL Most Valuable Player.

Isaac Milburn of the Madison Mallards was named 2025 NWL Pitcher of the Year. Milburn appeared in seven games with the Mallards, going 3-0 with a 2.76 ERA. In 42.1 innings, he struck out 50 batters while walking only seven. He also struck out two batters in the NWL All-Star Game.

Larry Edwards of the Waterloo Bucks broke the NWL single-season stolen bases record, surpassing Chandler Simpson's previous mark and ultimately finishing the season with 67. Edwards's record was surpassed by St. Cloud's Tanner Recchio in 2026, who managed to swipe 81 bags.

In the 2025 Major League Baseball draft, 79 former NWL players were selected by MLB teams. Brendan Summerhill was the highest-selected of these alums, going 42nd overall to the Tampa Bay Rays. Summerhill played for Traverse City in 2022 and appeared for both the Pit Spitters and Rockford Rivets in 2023, between seasons at Arizona.

== Baseball standings ==
=== Great Lakes Division ===
Great Lakes East Sub-Division Regular Season Standings
Pos	Team	G	W	L	Pct.
1	xy – Traverse City Pit Spitters	71	49	22	.690
2	z – Kalamazoo Growlers	72	37	35	.514
3	Royal Oak Leprechauns	72	35	37	.486
4	Battle Creek Battle Jacks	72	33	39	.458
5	Kenosha Kingfish	71	31	40	.437
6	Rockford Rivets	69	26	43	.377

Great Lakes West Sub-Division Regular Season Standings
Pos	Team	G	W	L	Pct.
1	y – Wausau Woodchucks	69	46	23	.667
2	Madison Mallards	69	44	25	.632
3	x – Green Bay Rockers	70	42	28	.600
4	Fond du Lac Dock Spiders	72	32	40	.444
5	Lakeshore Chinooks	72	28	44	.389
6	Wisconsin Rapids Rafters	71	22	49	.310

=== Great Plains Division ===
Great Plains East Sub-Division Regular Season Standings
Pos	Team	G	W	L	Pct.
1	y – Duluth Huskies	72	45	27	.625
2	Waterloo Bucks	72	42	30	.583
3	Thunder Bay Border Cats	70	40	30	.571
4	x – La Crosse Loggers	71	38	33	.535
5	Eau Claire Express	71	32	39	.451
6	Rochester Honkers	72	18	54	.250

Great Plains West Sub-Division Regular Season Standings
Pos	Team	G	W	L	Pct.
1	x – St. Cloud Rox	69	47	22	.681
2	Badlands Big Sticks	70	41	29	.586
3	y – Mankato MoonDogs	70	38	32	.543
4	Willmar Stingers	71	38	33	.535
5	Minot Hot Tots	72	28	44	.389
6	Bismarck Larks	72	18	54	.250

- x – First Half Winner, clinched playoff spot
- y – Second Half Winner, clinched playoff spot
- z – Clinched playoff spot based on overall record

== Baseball playoffs ==
=== Format ===
First and second half sub-divisional winners were eligible for the playoffs. The two playoff-eligible teams in each sub-division competed in a best-of-three Sub-Divisional Series. The two Sub-Divisional Series winners played a one-game Divisional Championship Game. The two Divisional Championship Game winners played a one-game League Championship.

=== Playoff bracket ===
Sub-Division Championship Series
1	Traverse City	6	5
2	Kalamazoo	1	0
↑ Great Lakes East / ↓ Great Lakes West
1	Wausau	4	4
2	Green Bay	8	6
↑ Great Lakes / ↓ Great Plains
1	Duluth	6	8
2	La Crosse	2	0
↑ Great Plains East / ↓ Great Plains West
1	St. Cloud	1	4	4
2	Mankato	2	0	10

Division Championship
1	Traverse City	5
2	Green Bay	10
1	Duluth	4
2	Mankato	1

Northwoods League Championship
1	Duluth	8
2	Green Bay	10

== Baseball statistical leaders ==
For cumulative stats, leaders include all league players. For rate stats, leaders include only qualifiers. Qualified hitters must have 2.70 plate appearances per team game. Per NWL standards, qualified pitchers must have minimum .80 innings pitched per team game. This significantly limits the pool of those qualifying for pitching rate stats.

=== Hitting ===
Stat	Player	Team	Total
H	Dylan Schlotterback	Woodchucks	89
HR	Ethan Surowiec	Huskies	17
RBI	Ethan Surowiec	Huskies	68
AVG	Aaron Piasecki	Pit Spitters	.406
OPS	Ethan Surowiec	Huskies	1.255
SB	Larry Edwards	Bucks	67

=== Pitching ===
Stat	Player	Team	Total
W	Jack Crittendon	Growlers	8
SO	Caleb Koskie, JP Robertson	Moondogs, Rox	T-59
SV	Brandon Jaenke	Rox	15

== Baseball All-Star selections ==
=== Mid-season All-Star Game ===
The 2025 Northwoods League All-Star Game was held at Warner Park in Madison, Wisconsin. The Great Plains Division defeated the Great Lakes Division 3-2. The following players were selected to participate in the game.

Great Lakes Division

Hitters
Position	Player	Team
C	Ryan Bakes	Kingfish
C	Max Soliz	Woodchucks
1B	Ryan Tyranski	Leprechauns
2B	Aaron Piasecki	Pit Spitters
3B	Mikey Bell	Mallards
SS	Noah Coy	Growlers
IF	Noah Ruiz	Rafters
UTL	Beckett Zavorak	Chinooks
DH	MJ Sweeney	Mallards
OF	Josh Algarin	Battle Jacks
OF	Christian Smith-Johnson	Woodchucks
OF	Noah Malone	Woodchucks
OF	Isaac Sturgess	Pit Spitters
OF	Jarren Sanderson	Dock Spiders

Pitchers
Position	Player	Team
P	Isaac Milburn	Mallards
P	Tyler Guerin	Mallards
P	Maddox Long	Rockers
P	Maximus McClellan	Kingfish
P	Ethan Cole	Dock Spiders
P	Alex LePage	Rockers
P	Reece Tarini	Rivets
P	Jack Griffiths	Pit Spitters
P	Reece Clapp	Woodchucks
P	Adam Berghorst	Growlers
P	Logan Pikur	Pit Spitters
P	Jack Critterdon	Growlers
P	Koshiro Ohno	Rockers

Great Plains Division

Hitters
Position	Player	Team
C	Ryan Tayman	Stingers
C	Chayton Fischer	Big Sticks
C	Carter Jorissen	Rox
1B	Matthew Pena	Stingers
2B	Brayden Jefferis	Loggers
3B	Ethan Surowiec	Huskies
SS	Austin Haley	Rox
IF	Manny Alberto	Border Cats
IF	Troy Berg	Big Sticks
UTL	Matt Toomey	Hot Tots
UTL	Maddox Haley	Honkers
DH	RJ Hamilton	Loggers
OF	Henry Allen	Hot Tots
OF	Connor Massimini	Big Sticks
OF	Erick Dessens	Larks
OF	Jake Bechtel	Bucks
OF	Mike Smith, Jr.	Huskies

Pitchers
Position	Player	Team
P	Walker Retz	Express
P	Sam Stockman	MoonDogs
P	Jake Burcham	Rox
P	Tyler Glowacki	Bucks
P	Ismael Quintero	Big Sticks
P	Kasen McCawley	Big Sticks
P	Parker Thomas	Huskies
P	Caden Richardson	Loggers
P	Ashton Michek	Loggers
P	JP Robertson	Rox
P	Brandon Jaenke	Rox
P	Ryan Radkey	Larks

=== Full-season All-Stars ===
After the season concluded, the league announced its Post-Season All-Stars for the full regular season. This group included players who performed well over the course of the entire season. Several players were selected to both the mid-season All-Star Game and the Post-Season All-Star team.

Great Lakes Division

Hitters
Position	Player	Team
C	Max Soliz	Woodchucks
1B	Ryan Tyranski	Leprechauns
2B	Grady Mee	Pit Spitters
2B	Tate Shimao	Rivets
3B	Dylan Schlotterback	Woodchucks
SS	Noah Coy	Growlers
IF	Mikey Bell	Mallards
OF	Josh Algarin	Battle Jacks
OF	Christian Smith-Johnson	Woodchucks
OF	Noah Malone	Woodchucks
OF	Aaron Piasecki	Pit Spitters
DH	MJ Sweeney	Mallards

Pitchers
Position	Player	Team
P	Isaac Milburn	Mallards
P	Austin Wolfe	Battle Jacks
P	Maximus McClellan	Kingfish
P	Jack Critterdon	Growlers
P	Koshiro Ohno	Rockers
P	Nick Mirabella	Pit Spitters

Great Plains Division

Hitters
Position	Player	Team
C	Augusto Mungarrietta	Rox
C	Jimmy Nugent	Bucks
1B	Blake Cavill	Hot Tots
2B	Adrian Beltre, Jr.	MoonDogs
2B	Armani Guzman	Stingers
3B	Ethan Surowiec	Huskies
SS	JJ Moran	Eau Claire
IF	Tyson LeBlanc	Rox
OF	Henry Allen	Hot Tots
OF	Larry Edwards	Bucks
OF	Jake Bechtel	Bucks
DH	Joshua Dykhoff	Rox

Pitchers
Position	Player	Team
P	Walker Retz	Express
P	Porter Buursema	Stingers
P	Dawson Hargrove	Express
P	Nick Terhaar	Huskies
P	JP Robertson	Rox
P	Brandon Jaenke	Rox
P	Landon Waters	Larks

== NWL alumni in MLB ==
=== 2025 MLB debuts ===
The following is a list of NWL alums who made their Major League Baseball debuts in the 2025 MLB season.

Name	MLB debut	Debut team	Former NWL team(s)	Season(s) in NWL
Drake Baldwin	3/27	Braves	Bobbers, Mallards	2020-21
Kristian Campbell	3/27	Red Sox	Huskies	2022
Hayden Senger	3/27	Mets	Chinooks	2016
Chad Patrick	3/29	Brewers	Pit Spitters	2019-20
Chase Meidroth	4/11	White Sox	Jackrabbits	2021
Logan VanWey	4/11	Astros	Huskies, Loggers	2018-19, 2020
Caleb Durbin	4/18	Brewers	Rivets, Dock Spiders	2019, 2020-21
Chandler Simpson	4/19	Rays	Dock Spiders	2021
Ryan Bergert	4/26	Padres	Dock Spiders	2020
Grant Wolfram	4/27	Orioles	Growlers	2016
Maverick Handley	4/29	Orioles	Mallards	2017
Noah Cameron	4/30	Royals	Stingers	2020
Tim Elko	5/10	White Sox	Dock Spiders	2019-20
Colton Gordon	5/14	Astros	Kingfish	2018-19
Ryan Fitzgerald	5/16	Twins	Kingfish	2014
Carson McCusker	5/18	Twins	Kingfish	2018
Denzel Clarke	5/23	Athletics	Jackrabbits	2019
John Rave	5/26	Royals	Rivets	2017
Drew Avans	5/27	Athletics	Rox	2017
Andrew Hoffman	5/30	Royals	Pit Spitters	2019-20
Jack Winkler	5/31	Marlins	Rox	2020-21
Ryan Ritter	6/6	Rockies	Dock Spiders	2020
Kyle Teel	6/6	White Sox	Rafters	2020-21
Otto Kemp	6/7	Phillies	Rox	2021
Andre Granillo	6/12	Cardinals	MoonDogs	2020
Carson Seymour	6/29	Giants	Rivets	2020
Travis Adams	7/5	Twins	Rafters	2020
Alex Carrillo	7/8	Mets	Rox	2019
Brice Matthews	7/11	Astros	Rox	2021-22
Troy Johnston	7/29	Marlins	Bullfrogs	2017
Dugan Darnell	8/1	Rockies	Rivets	2019
Jakob Marsee	8/1	Marlins	Resorters, Jackrabbits, Pit Spitters	2020-22
CJ Kayfus	8/2	Guardians	Woodchucks	2021
Bob Seymour	8/15	Rays	Rox, Rivets	2018/2020
Hayden Harris	9/2	Braves	Rafters	2021
Christian Roa	9/6	Marlins	Loggers	2018
Nick Raquet	9/8	Cardinals	Loggers	2016
Zach Cole	9/12	Astros	Honkers	2021
Carson Ragsdale	9/14	Orioles	Mallards	2018

=== Awards and highlights ===
NWL alums selected the 2025 MLB All-Star Game:

- Pete Alonso (Madison Mallards, 2014)
- Zach McKinstry (Waterloo Bucks, 2015)
- Chris Sale (La Crosse Loggers, 2008)
- Jacob Wilson (Mankato MoonDogs, 2021)

NWL alum selected as National League Rookie of the Year:

- Drake Baldwin (K-Town Bobbers, 2020; Madison Mallards, 2021)

NWL alums awarded with a 2025 Silver Slugger:

- Pete Alonso (Madison Mallards, 2014)
- Zach McKinstry (Waterloo Bucks, 2015)

NWL alums awarded with a 2025 Gold Glove:

- Nico Hoerner (Madison Mallards, 2016)
- Marcus Semien (Alexandria Beetles, 2009-10)

NWL alums who were members of the World Series-winning Dodgers:

- Alex Call (Eau Claire Express, 2013-14)
- Will Klein (Lakeshore Chinooks, 2019)
- Alex Vesia (Mankato MoonDogs, 2016)

== Softball season overview ==
=== Background ===
The 2025 season was the second season of Northwoods League Softball (NWLS). There were 5 softball teams, playing in one single division. The two teams with the best record competed in a playoff series for the NWLS championship. The Mankato Habaneros entered the season as defending champions, having been granted that achievement due to having the highest record in the inaugural 2024 season.

For 2025, the league expanded to Wausau, Wisconsin. At an unveiling ceremony in April 2025, the Wausau Ignite identity was announced.

=== Team highlights ===
The Madison Night Mares had an exceptional season, ultimately setting an NWLS record for full season wins, finishing at 35-7. This record would broken by the Night Mares the following season.

The Minot Honeybees finished the season with a 21-21 record, earning the right to compete with Madison for the NWLS championship in a best of three series. Madison swept Minot and won their first NWLS championship.

=== Individual highlights ===
Paytn Monticelli pitched for the Night Mares in 2025, in the summer between her junior year at Oklahoma and senior year at LSU. She later became the first NWLS alum to play professional softball, debuting in June 2026 with the Atlanta Smoke of the Professional Softball League.

Madison dominated post-season individual NWLS honors. Catcher Hilary Blomberg won NWLS Player of Year for the second year, leading the league in home runs (11) and RBI (47), while also posting a .402 batting average (.471). Fellow Night Mare Karlie McKenzie won the NWLS Pitcher of the Year award, leading the league in ERA (1.86) and wins (10). Night Mares Coach Lexi Godwin was named NWLS Coach of Year.

== Softball standings ==
=== Regular season standings ===
Pos	Team	G	W	L	Pct.
1	Madison Night Mares	42	35	7	.833
2	Minot Honeybees	42	21	21	.500
3	Mankato Habaneros	42	20	22	.476
4	La Crosse Steam	42	16	26	.381
5	Wausau Ignite	42	12	30	.286

== Softball statistical leaders ==
For cumulative stats, leaders include all league players. For average stats, leaders include only qualifiers. Per NWL softball standards, qualified hitters must have 2.00 plate appearances per team game and qualified pitchers must have minimum 1.0 innings pitched per team game.

=== Hitting ===
Stat	Player	Team	Total
AVG	Ava Carroll	Night Mares	.459
OPS	Ella Stephenson	Night Mares	1.410
HR	Hilary Blomberg	Night Mares	11
RBIs	Hilary Blomberg, Mia Johnson	Night Mares, Ignite	t-47
SB	Carly Cummings	Honeybees	18

=== Pitching ===
Stat	Player	Team	Total
W	Karlie McKenzie	Night Mares	10
ERA	Karlie McKenzie	Night Mares	1.86
SO	Julianna Verni	Honeybees	95
SV	Julianna Verni	Honeybees	2

== Softball Post-Season All-Star selections ==
The following players were selected to the 2025 NWLS Post-Season All-Star Team.

Position	Player	Team
C	Avary Makarewicz	Steam
1B/UTL	Emma Kavanagh	Night Mares
2B	Riley Schwisow	Ignite
3B	Bella Cimino	Honeybees
SS	Taylor Chillingworth	Honeybees
UTL	Mia Johnson	Ignite
UTL	Hilary Blomberg	Night Mares
OF	Ava Carroll	Night Mares
OF	Ella Stephenson	Night Mares
OF	Trinity Gregg	Honeybees
P	Karlie McKenzie	Night Mares
P	Julianna Verni	Honeybees
P	Alexis Michon	Habaneros
P	Paytn Monticelli	Night Mares

== See also ==
- 2025 Major League Baseball season
- 2025 FCBL season
- 2025 Prospect League season
