= 2026 Northwoods League season =

33rd annual season of the Northwoods League

- League: Northwoods League
- Sport: Baseball; Fastpitch softball
- Duration: May 25 – August 8 (Baseball playoffs: August 9 – August 13)
- Games: Baseball: 890; Softball: 124
- Teams: Baseball: 26; Softball: 6

Northwoods League Championship
- Champions: Royal Oak Leprechauns (baseball); Madison Night Mares (softball)
- Runners-up: St. Cloud Rox (baseball); Wausau Ignite (softball)

Seasons
- ← 2025 2027 →

The 2026 Northwoods League season was the 33rd season of baseball and 3rd season of softball in the Northwoods League, a collegiate summer baseball and softball organization. The season concluded in August with the Royal Oak Leprechauns winning the baseball championship and the Madison Night Mares winning the softball championship.

== Baseball season overview ==
=== Background ===
In 2026, there were 26 Northwoods League baseball teams, split evenly between the Great Lakes and Great Plains Divisions. These divisions were then split up between the Great Lakes East, Great Lakes West, Great Plains East, and Great Plains West subdivisions. The Green Bay Rockers entered the season as defending champions, having defeated the Duluth Huskies in the league's 2025 championship game.

It was announced during the offseason that the city of Richmond, Indiana would be awarded a franchise, and the team name was later revealed to be the Flying Mummies. It was also announced that, to provide the league with an even number of teams, the Minnesota Mud Puppies travel team would return to the league. Ahead of the season, the league also announced that the All-Star game would take place at Field of Dreams Ballpark in Dyersville, Iowa on July 8, 2026.

=== Season ===
The season began on May 25 with an expectation of a 72-game per team schedule, excluding the Mud Puppies, who played a significantly fewer number of games by design. Several games were cancelled or rescheduled due to poor air quality from the 2026 Canadian wildfires, particularly those of the Thunder Bay Border Cats, Duluth Huskies, and Wausau Woodchucks.

The season was split into two halves, with the top two teams in each sub-division--the standings leader from each half--qualifying for the playoffs that began on August 9. In the Great Lakes division, neither of the two teams (the Traverse City Pit Spitters and Wausau Woodchucks) with the best full-season record in their respective sub-division qualified for the playoffs. In the East sub-division, the Kenosha Kingfish had the best first-half record and the Royal Oak Leprechauns had the best second half. In the West, the Madison Mallards had the best first half and the Lakeshore Chinooks had the best second half. In the Great Plains East, the La Crosse Loggers (best first half) and Eau Claire Express (best second) were playoff qualifiers. The West sub-division, the St. Cloud Rox took the first half while the Willmar Stingers took the second.

In the four best-of-three subdivision series, the Leprechauns swept the Kingfish, the Mallards swept the Chinooks, the Express took 2 of 3 against the Loggers, and the Rox took 2 of 3 against the Stingers. In the single-game Great Lakes Division championship, the Leprechauns defeated the Mallards 6-1, and in the Great Plains, the Rox defeated the Express 10-5.

The NWL Championship game was held at Joe Faber Field on 8/13/26. Both Royal Oak and St. Cloud were held scoreless through six innings. The Rox scored one run in the 7th on a home run by Nolan Geislinger. The Leprechauns got on the board in the 8th with a 2-RBI single by Luke Kosko, and added another run when Connor Larkin scored on a 3rd out putout. The Leprechauns defeated the Rox by a score of 3-1.

=== Individual achievements ===
St. Cloud's Tanner Recchio had an exceptional season on the basepaths. On June 21st, he broke the all-time individual NWL career stolen bases record, which had stood at 90 total for 18 years. Recchio had tallied 34 stolen bases with the Mud Puppies in 2023 and another 34 with the Rox in 2025. He finished the 2026 season with 81, shattering the previous single-season record of 67 and setting a new all-time individual record with 149.

Royal Oak's Luke Kosko was named NWL Most Valuable Player after leading all NWL players in both home runs (17) and RBI (72), posting a .349 batting average (and 1.099 OPS) across 215 regular season at-bats, as well as playing a key role in the Leprechauns' NWL Championship victory.

Madison's Ckyler Tengler was named NWL Pitcher of the Year. Tengler appeared in 10 games for the Mallards and went 6-1 with a 2.41 ERA. In 52.1 innings pitched, he struck out 55 batters while walking only 11. He also pitched an inning in the NWL All-Star game, allowing no runs on no hits.

In the 2026 Major League Baseball Draft, 97 former NWL players were selected by MLB teams. Vahn Lackey was the highest-selected of these alums, going third overall to the Minnesota Twins. Lackey played for Traverse City in 2024 between seasons at Georgia Tech.

== Baseball standings ==
=== Great Lakes Division ===
Great Lakes East Sub-Division Regular Season Standings
Pos	Team	G	W	L	Pct.
1	Traverse City Pit Spitters	72	45	27	.625
2	y – Royal Oak Leprechauns	72	43	29	.597
3	x – Kenosha Kingfish	71	37	34	.521
4	Kalamazoo Growlers	72	36	36	.500
5	Rockford Rivets	71	31	40	.437
6	Richmond Flying Mummies	72	29	43	.403
7	Battle Creek Battle Jacks	71	22	49	.310

Great Lakes West Sub-Division Regular Season Standings
Pos	Team	G	W	L	Pct.
1	Wausau Woodchucks	66	43	23	.652
2	y – Lakeshore Chinooks	70	43	27	.614
3	x – Madison Mallards	69	41	28	.594
4	Green Bay Rockers	69	39	30	.565
5	Fond du Lac Dock Spiders	69	30	39	.435
6	Wisconsin Rapids Rafters	69	20	49	.290

=== Great Plains Division ===
Great Plains East Sub-Division Regular Season Standings
Pos	Team	G	W	L	Pct.
1	y – Eau Claire Express	69	46	23	.667
2	x – La Crosse Loggers	69	45	24	.652
3	Rochester Honkers	70	34	34	.486
4	Waterloo Bucks	69	30	39	.435
5	Duluth Huskies	70	29	41	.414
6	Thunder Bay Border Cats	68	27	41	.397
7	Minnesota Mud Puppies	35	13	22	.371

Great Plains West Sub-Division Regular Season Standings
Pos	Team	G	W	L	Pct.
1	x – St. Cloud Rox	69	42	27	.609
2	y –Willmar Stingers	70	37	33	.529
3	Mankato MoonDogs	70	37	33	.529
4	Bismarck Larks	69	34	35	.493
5	Badlands Big Sticks	70	31	39	.443
6	Minot Hot Tots	69	26	43	.377

- x – First Half Winner, clinched playoff spot
- y – Second Half Winner, clinched playoff spot

== Baseball playoffs ==
=== Format ===
First and second half sub-divisional winners were eligible for the playoffs. The two playoff-eligible teams in each sub-division competed in a best-of-three Sub-Divisional Series. The two Sub-Divisional Series winners played a one-game Divisional Championship Game. The two Divisional Championship Game winners played a one-game League Championship.

=== Playoff bracket ===
Sub-Division Championship Series
1	Royal Oak	6	5
2	Kenosha	4	3
↑ Great Lakes East / ↓ Great Lakes West
1	Lakeshore	2	4
2	Madison	9	11
↑ Great Lakes / ↓ Great Plains
1	Eau Claire	6	1	3
2	La Crosse	3	4	1
↑ Great Plains East / ↓ Great Plains West
1	St. Cloud	7	0	10
2	Willmar	3	4	9

Division Championship
1	Royal Oak	6
2	Madison	1
1	Eau Claire	5
2	St. Cloud	10

Northwoods League Championship
1	St. Cloud	1
2	Royal Oak	3

== Baseball statistical leaders ==
For cumulative stats, leaders include all league players. For average stats, leaders include only qualifiers. Qualified hitters must have 2.70 plate appearances per team game. Qualified pitchers must have minimum .80 innings pitched per team game.

=== Hitting ===
Stat	Player	Team	Total
HR	Luke Kosko	Leprechauns	17
AVG	Savion Flowers	Loggers	.373
RBIs	Luke Kosko	Leprechauns	72
SB	Tanner Recchio	Rox	81

=== Pitching ===
Stat	Player	Team	Total
W	Kyle Timko	Pit Spitters	7
ERA	Jackson Sobel	Kingfish	2.59
SO	Spencer Boynton	Leprechauns	76
SV	Pierce Anderson, Olivier Martel, Eli Hoyt, Parker Barraza	Huskies, Express, Mallards, Stingers	7

== Baseball All-Star selections ==
=== Mid-season All-Star Game ===
The 2026 Northwoods League All-Star Game was held at Field of Dreams Ballpark in Dyersville, Iowa. This game took place on July 8, 2026, with the Great Lakes division all-stars defeating those from the Great Plains division 4-2.

Great Lakes Division

Hitters
Position	Player	Team
C	Oliver Service	Leprechauns
C	Brendan Fritch	Kingfish
1B	Ryan Chase	Woodchucks
2B	Jack Gold	Mallards
3B	Jax LeGrand	Rafters
SS	J.R. Nelson	Kingfish
IF	Jake Stedman	Battle Jacks
UTL	David Hogg II	Chinooks
UTL	Jonah Weathers	Mallards
UTL	Brendan Thompson	Battle Jacks
OF	Luke Kosko	Leprechauns
OF	Josh Campbell	Growlers
OF	Eli Selga	Rockers
OF	Dylan Frank	Rafters
OF	Jackson Thomas	Flying Mummies

Pitchers
Position	Player	Team
P	Ben Buering	Rivets
P	Kyle Manship	Dock Spiders
P	Jackson Sobel	Kingfish
P	Bryce Suiter	Pit Spitters
P	RJ Anglin	Growlers
P	Holden Harris	Rockers
P	Ethan Bauerschmidt	Mallards
P	Ckyler Tengler	Mallards
P	Kellen English	Leprechauns
P	Charlie Wolf	Pit Spitters
P	Brady Wright	Woodchucks
P	Connor Kelly	Pit Spitters
P	Henry Slaby	Growlers

Great Plains Division

Hitters
Position	Player	Team
C	Hollon Brock	Express
C	Chayton Fischer	Big Sticks
1B	Jalen Smith	Huskies
2B	Cameron Sewell	Honkers
3B	Jose Lopez	Loggers
SS	Joey Senstock	Loggers
IF	Jalen Evans	Big Sticks
UTL	Colin Coonradt	Bucks
UTL	CJ Varsho	Express
OF	Sam Harry	Honkers
OF	Eli Small	Loggers
OF	Nolan Geislinger	Rox
OF	Jordan Carter	Larks
OF	Owen Bond	Mud Puppies
OF	Kellan Burke	Hot Tots

Pitchers
Position	Player	Team
P	Anthony Unga	Border Cats
P	Gavin Parkerson	Larks
P	Olivier Martel	Express
P	Brock Adamson	Express
P	Luke Ballantyne	MoonDogs
P	Hunter Guenther	Express
P	Ethan Felling	Rox
P	Brady Ferguson	Rox
P	Brandon Jaenke	Rox
P	Cristien Banda	Loggers
P	Mason Beltrand	Loggers
P	Jackson Niederwerder	Express
P	Parker Barrazza	Stingers

=== Full-season All-Stars ===
After the season concluded, the league announced its Post-Season All-Stars for the full regular season. This group included players who performed well over the course of the entire season. Several players were selected to both the mid-season All-Star Game and the Post-Season All-Star team.

Great Lakes Division

Hitters
Position	Player	Team
C	Oliver Service	Leprechauns
1B	Ryan Chase	Woodchucks
2B	David Ballenilla	Rockers
3B	Mason Barth	Leprechauns
SS	Brendan Thompson	Battle Jacks
OF	Luke Kosko	Leprechauns
OF	Josh Campbell	Growlers
OF	Coleman Lewis	Rockers
DH	Ethan Guerra	Pit Spitters

Pitchers
Position	Player	Team
P	Ckyler Tengler	Mallards
P	Jackson Sobel	Kingfish
P	Spencer Boynton	Leprechauns
P	Keith Eusebio	Rivets
P	Kyle Timko	Pit Spitters

Great Plains Division

Hitters
Position	Player	Team
C	Cooper Kruk	Honkers
1B	Anthony Martinez	Express
2B	Caleb Parker	Bucks
3B	David Estrada	Stingers
SS	George McIntyre	Huskies
OF	Sam Harry	Honkers
OF	Eli Small	Loggers
OF	Savion Flowers	Loggers
OF	Seth Thompson	Honkers

Pitchers
Position	Player	Team
P	Brock Adamson	Express
P	Emerson McKnight	Rox
P	Tyler Bribiescas	Border Cats
P	Devin Costa	Huskies
P	Jackson Niederwerder	Express

== NWL Alumni in MLB ==
=== 2026 MLB Debuts ===
The following is a list of NWL alums who made their Major League Baseball debuts in the 2026 MLB season.

Name	MLB debut	Debut team	Former NWL team(s)	Season(s) in NWL
JJ Wetherholt	3/26	Cardinals	Mallards	2022
George Klassen	4/5	Angels	Chinooks	2022
Tyler Schweitzer	4/8	White Sox	Chinooks	2021
Duncan Davitt	4/10	White Sox	Bucks	2020-21
Riley Cornelio	4/24	Nationals	Rox	2021
John Klein	5/2	Twins	Stingers	2021-22
Brycen Mautz	5/24	Cardinals	Bucks	2021
Tommy Troy	5/24	Diamondbacks	Pit Spitters	2020
Tanner Andrews	5/25	Blue Jays	Growlers	2016
Charles McAdoo	5/29	Blue Jays	MoonDogs	2022
Hayden Juenger	5/31	Blue Jays	MoonDogs	2019
Mike Paredes	5/31	Twins	Growlers	2019
LuJames Groover	6/5	Diamondbacks	Woodchucks	2021
Ivan Johnson	6/30	Reds	Growlers	2018
Gabriel Hughes	7/3	Rockies	Resorters	2020
Lucas Spence	7/17	Astros	Rivets	2024
Brian Keller	7/25	Phillies	Loggers, Chinooks	2014, 2015
Luke Murphy	7/31	Angels	Bombers	2020
Andrew Pinckney	8/5	Nationals	Rox	2020-21
Brett Bateman	8/7	Blue Jays	Stingers	2021-22
Ethan Pecko	8/19	Astros	Woodchucks	2023
Jack Ralston	8/23	Marlins	Loggers	2015-16
Ben Ross	9/1	Twins	Rafters	2022
Jack Sinclair	9/4	Nationals	Rafters	2019

=== Awards and highlights ===
NWL alums selected to the 2026 Major League Baseball All-Star Game:

- Drake Baldwin (K-Town Bobbers, 2020; Madison Mallards, 2021)
- Ernie Clement (Wisconsin Rapids Rafters, 2015)
- Chris Sale (La Crosse Loggers, 2008)
- Louis Varland (Willmar Stingers, 2017-18)

NWL alum awarded with a 2026 Gold Glove:

- Caleb Durbin (Rockford Rivets, 2019; Fond du Lac Dock Spiders, 2020-21)

NWL alums awarded with a 2026 Silver Slugger:

- Pete Alonso (Madison Mallards, 2014)
- Chase Meidroth (Kokomo Jackrabbits, 2021)

NWL alums who were members of the 2026 World Series-winning Milwaukee Brewers:

- Colton Gordon (Kenosha Kingfish, 2018-19)
- Garrett Mitchell (Mankato MoonDogs, 2018)
- Joey Ortiz (Willmar Stingers, 2018)
- Chad Patrick (Traverse City Pit Spitters, 2020-21)

== Softball season overview ==
=== Background ===
The 2026 season was the third season of Northwoods League Softball (NWLS). There were 6 softball teams, playing in one single division. The two teams with the best record competed in a playoff series for the NWLS championship. The Madison Night Mares entered the season as defending champions, having defeated the Minot Honeybees in the 2025 championship game.

For 2026, the league expanded to Grand Forks, North Dakota; marking the first Northwoods League Softball team to play in a non-Northwoods League Baseball stadium. On November 11, 2025, the team's name was revealed as the Grand Forks Spitfires.

=== Team highlights ===
The Night Mares had an exceptional season, winning their first 16 games in a row before finally falling to the Wausau Ignite 13-10 in the first game of June 28 doubleheader. The Night Mares ultimately set an NWLS record for full season wins, finishing at 36-6.

The Ignite finished the season with a 21-19 record, earning the right to compete with Madison for the NWLS championship in a best of three series. Game 1 was held in Wausau on 8/3, with the Night Mares winning 3-1. Game 2 was held in Madison on 8/5, with the Night Mares winning 7-1, sweeping the Ignite and winning their second consecutive NWLS championship.

=== Individual highlights ===
In June, Paytn Monticelli became the first NWLS alum to play professional softball, debuting in June with the Atlanta Smoke of the Professional Softball League. Monticelli pitched for the Night Mares in 2025, in the summer between her junior year at Oklahoma and senior year at LSU.

Madison dominated post-season individual NWLS honors. Catcher Hilary Blomberg won NWLS Player of Year for the second year in a row, setting a new NWLS home run record with 20. She also led the league in RBI (59) and batting average (.471) among full-season players. Fellow Night Mare Ryan Maddox won the NWLS Pitcher of the Year award, leading the league in ERA (3.37) and tying the lead with 10 wins. Coaches Kara Hammock (Madison) and Brandi Alonzo (La Crosse) were named NWLS Co-Coaches of Year.

== Softball standings and playoffs ==
=== Regular season standings ===
Pos	Team	G	W	L	Pct.
1	Madison Night Mares	42	36	6	.857
2	Wausau Ignite	40	21	19	.525
3	Grand Forks Spitfires	40	20	20	.500
4	La Crosse Steam	42	20	22	.476
5	Mankato Habaneros	42	14	28	.333
6	Minot Honeybees	42	13	29	.282

=== Playoffs ===
The Madison Night Mares, with the highest winning percentage in the league, secured the top seed in the playoffs. The Wausau Ignite, with the second best record in the league, earned the right to compete against the Night Mares in a best of three series.

Game 1

August 3, 2026 6:35 p.m. (CDT) at Athletic Park in Wausau, Wisconsin
Team	1	2	3	4	5	6	7	R	H	E
Madison	0	0	3	0	0	0	0	3	5	1
Wausau	1	0	0	0	0	0	0	1	5	0
WP: Elena Krause LP: Zoey Mills; Attendance: 656; Box Score

Game 2

August 5, 2026 6:05 p.m. (CDT) at Warner Park in Madison, Wisconsin
Team	1	2	3	4	5	6	7	R	H	E
Wausau	0	0	0	1	0	0	0	1	4	0
Madison	0	1	3	0	3	0	0	7	9	1
WP: Ryan Maddox LP: Zoey Mills; Home runs: WAU: Viola Smith; MAD: Tia Durst, Hilary Blomberg, Emma Kavanagh; Attendance: 1,452; Box Score

The Night Mares swept the Ignite and won their second consecutive NWLS championship.

== Softball regular season statistical leaders ==
For cumulative stats, leaders include all league players. For average stats, leaders include only qualifiers. Per NWL softball standards, qualified hitters must have 2.00 plate appearances per team game and qualified pitchers must have minimum 1.0 innings pitched per team game.

=== Hitting ===
Stat	Player	Team	Total
HR	Hilary Blomberg	Nightmares	20
AVG	Megan McGinnis	Ignite	.500
RBIs	Hilary Blomberg	Nightmares	59
SB	Ahmari Braden	Nightmares	19

=== Pitching ===
Stat	Player	Team	Total
W	Zoey Mills, Ryan Maddox, Kendall Weik	Ignite, Nightmares, Nightmares	10
ERA	Ryan Maddox	Nightmares	3.37
SO	Preslynn Baker	Steam	85
SV	Preslynn Baker	Steam	3

== Softball All-Star selections ==
In July, the NWLS held its inaugural All-Star game at Warner Park in Madison, Wisconsin. Although the NWLS did not have divisions this season, team representatives were separated into a West team (Grand Forks, Minot, Mankato) and East team (Wausau, La Crosse, Madison). In a walk-off victory, the East team won the game 11-10.

=== West ===
Hitters
Position	Player	Team
C	Ally Hetzel	Spitfires
C	Olivia Hernandez	Honeybees
1B	Indigo Fish	Habaneros
2B	Bridget Chapman	Honeybees
3B	Taylor Larson	Spitfires
SS	Sara Simon	Honeybees
UTL	Ava Parent	Habaneros
OF	Clare Rettler	Honeybees
OF	Alex Graham	Spitfires
OF	Emma Peeples	Spitfires

Pitchers
Position	Player	Team
P	Parker Rowden	Honeybees
P	Mattison Kwarta	Spitfires
P	Morgan Kostecka	Habaneros
P	Sailor Hall	Habaneros

=== East ===
Hitters
Position	Player	Team
C	Hilary Blomberg	Night Mares
C	Avary Makarewicz	Steam
1B	Kyra Smith	Night Mares
2B	Marley Teasley	Ignite
3B	Claire Calmes	Ignite
SS	Mickayla Tosch	Night Mares
UTL	Josie Brudos	Steam
UTL	Mia Johnson	Ignite
OF	Ava Carroll	Night Mares
OF	Danielle Lucey	Night Mares
OF	Jackie Larsen	Steam

Pitchers
Position	Player	Team
P	Leila Ammon	Night Mares
P	Ryan Maddox	Night Mares
P	Andrea Jaskowiak	Night Mares
P	Zoey Mills	Ignite

=== Full-season All-Star Team ===
After the NWLS season concluded, the league announced the Post-Season All-Star Team. This group included players who performed well over the course of the entire season, including the second half. Most Post-Season All-Stars were also mid-season All-Stars.

=== East ===
Hitters
Position	Player	Team
C	Hilary Blomberg	Night Mares
1B	Tele Jennings	Night Mares
2B	Marley Teasley	Ignite
3B	Riley Schwisow	Ignite
SS	Mickayla Tosch	Night Mares
UTL	Mia Johnson	Ignite
OF	Ava Carroll	Night Mares
OF	Danielle Lucey	Night Mares
OF	Trinity Gregg	Steam

Pitchers
Position	Player	Team
P	Ryan Maddox	Night Mares
P	Preslynn Baker	Steam
P	Zoey Mills	Ignite
P	Andrea Jaskowiak	Night Mares
P	Kendall Weik	Night Mares

=== West ===
Hitters
Position	Player	Team
C	Ally Hetzel	Spitfires
1B	Shannon Cunningham	Spitfires
2B	Katy Olive	Habaneros
3B	Ellen Tarjan	Honeybees
SS	Sara Simon	Honeybees
UTL	Bridget Chapman	Honeybees
OF	Clare Rettler	Honeybees
OF	Olivia Pichardo	Habaneros
OF	Ava Parent	Habaneros

Pitchers
Position	Player	Team
P	Parker Rowden	Honeybees
P	Mattison Kwarta	Spitfires
P	Kylinn Stangl	Habaneros
P	Madison Wihlm	Spitfires
P	Madi Balk	Honeybees

== See also ==
- 2026 Appalachian League season
- 2026 FCBL season
- 2026 Major League Baseball season
- 2026 PGCBL season
- 2026 Prospect League season
