= 2024 Northwoods League season =

31st annual season of the Northwoods League

- League: Northwoods League
- Sport: Baseball; Fastpitch softball
- Duration: May 27 – August 10 (Baseball playoffs: August 11 – August 15)
- Games: Baseball: ~895; Softball: ~84
- Teams: Baseball: 26; Softball: 4

Northwoods League Championship
- Champions: Kalamazoo Growlers (baseball); Mankato Habaneros (softball)
- Runners-up: La Crosse Loggers (baseball); No runner-up (softball)

Seasons
- ← 2023 2025 →

The 2024 Northwoods League season was the 31st season of baseball and 1st season of softball in the Northwoods League, a collegiate summer baseball and softball organization. The season concluded in August with the Kalamazoo Growlers winning the baseball championship and the Mankato Habaneros earning the softball championship.

== Baseball season overview ==
=== Background ===
In 2024, there were 26 Northwoods League (NWL) baseball teams, split evenly between the Great Lakes and Great Plains Divisions. These divisions were then split up between the Great Lakes East, Great Lakes West, Great Plains East, and Great Plains West subdivisions. The Green Bay Rockers entered the season as defending champions, having defeated the St. Cloud Rox 4–3 in the league's 2023 championship game.

There were two new teams added to the NWL for the 2024 season, both of whom had previously existed in other collegiate summer baseball leagues and both of whom expanded the league's east-west geographic footprint. The Badlands Big Sticks of Dickinson, North Dakota had previously been members of the defunct Independence League and the Expedition League before that. The Big Sticks became the western-most team in the NWL. Additionally, the Royal Oak Leprechauns of Royal Oak, Michigan were shifted over from the Great Lakes Summer Collegiate League. The Leprechauns had previously played in Adrian, Michigan as the Irish Hills Leprechauns, but had relocated suburban Detroit after ballpark improvement efforts from Royal Oak area citizens, including former MLB player DJ LeMahieu. The Leprechauns became the NWL's easternmost team.

Another change heading into the season was that the league updated its branding and logos. The previously logo had the letter N with one of the vertical legs of the letter standing in for the trunk of an evergreen tree. The updated logo had a similar tree filling the negative space within the letter as well as a north star appearing in the night sky of the logo. Variants were created for the league at large, the baseball branch, and the new softball branch of the league.

=== Season ===
The regular season began on May 27, with the season split into two halves, and the top two teams in each sub-division—the standings leader from each half—qualified for the playoffs. The first half sub-division winners were the Rockford Rivets (Great Lakes East), Wausau Woodchucks (Great Lakes West), La Crosse Loggers (Great Plains East), and Willmar Stingers (Great Plains West). The second half sub-division winners were the Kalamazoo Growlers (Great Lakes East), Madison Mallards (Great Lakes West), Duluth Huskies (Great Plains East), and St. Cloud Rox (Great Plains West).

In the four best-of-three subdivision series, the Growlers took 2 of 3 from the Rivets, the Mallards took 2 of 3 against the Woodchucks, the Loggers swept the Huskies, and the Rox took 2 of 3 against the Stingers. In the single-game Great Lakes Division championship, the Growlers defeated the Mallards, and in the Great Plains, the Loggers defeated the Rox.

The NWL Championship game was held at Homer Stryker Field in Kalamazoo, Michigan on 8/15/24. At the end of 7 innings, the score was tied 7-7 and would stay at that until the bottom of the 14th inning. Brandon Sanchez hit a sacrifice fly and scored Gabe Springer. The Growlers won the 2024 NWL Championship.

=== Individual achievements ===
Outfielder Andrew Sojka of the Willmar Stingers was named 2024 NWL Player of the Year after batting .398 with 22 home runs, 22 doubles, five triples, and 73 RBI. He also set the all-time NWL home run record with 37 homers over the course of three seasons in the NWL.

Ryan Kraft of the Kalamazoo Growlers was named 2024 NWL Pitcher of the Year. Kraft appeared in nine games and held a 6–2 record with a 1.44 ERA. In 56.1 innings, he struck out 81 batters while walking only 10. He also pitched seven innings in the Growlers' Divisional Championship win over Madison, allowing only one hit, one run, and striking out seven.

In the 2024 Major League Baseball draft, 70 former NWL players were selected by MLB teams, including two players going in the top ten. Charlie Condon was the highest-selected of these alums, going 3rd overall to the Colorado Rockies. Condon had played for St. Cloud in 2022. JJ Wetherholt went to the St. Louis Cardinals at pick #7. Wetherholt had played for Madison in 2022.

== Baseball standings ==
=== Great Lakes Division ===
Great Lakes East Sub-Division Regular Season Standings
Pos	Team	G	W	L	Pct.
1	x – Rockford Rivets	72	47	25	.653
2	y – Kalamazoo Growlers	72	42	30	.583
3	Traverse City Pit Spitters	72	39	33	.542
4	Royal Oak Leprechauns	72	34	38	.472
5	Battle Creek Battle Jacks	72	32	40	.444
6	Kenosha Kingfish	72	31	41	.431
7	Kokomo Jackrabbits	72	22	50	.306

Great Lakes West Sub-Division Regular Season Standings
Pos	Team	G	W	L	Pct.
1	x – Wausau Woodchucks	69	50	19	.725
2	y – Madison Mallards	70	50	20	.714
3	Wisconsin Rapids Rafters	70	35	35	.500
4	Green Bay Rockers	70	33	37	.471
5	Fond du Lac Dock Spiders	69	29	40	.420
6	Lakeshore Chinooks	69	26	43	.377

=== Great Plains Division ===
Great Plains East Sub-Division Regular Season Standings
Pos	Team	G	W	L	Pct.
1	y – Duluth Huskies	69	38	31	.551
2	Waterloo Bucks	69	37	32	.536
3	Thunder Bay Border Cats	69	35	34	.507
4	Eau Claire Express	70	35	35	.500
5	x – La Crosse Loggers	70	33	37	.471
6	Rochester Honkers	70	29	41	.414
7	Minnesota Mud Puppies	33	5	28	.152

Great Plains West Sub-Division Regular Season Standings
Pos	Team	G	W	L	Pct.
1	x – Willmar Stingers	70	44	26	.629
2	y – St. Cloud Rox	69	43	26	.623
3	Mankato MoonDogs	70	38	32	.543
4	Bismarck Larks	70	34	36	.486
5	Minot Hot Tots	70	27	43	.386
6	Badlands Big Sticks	70	26	44	.371

- x – First Half Winner, clinched playoff spot
- y – Second Half Winner, clinched playoff spot

== Baseball playoffs ==
=== Format ===
First and second half sub-divisional winners were eligible for the playoffs. The two playoff-eligible teams in each sub-division competed in a best-of-three Sub-Divisional Series. The two Sub-Divisional Series winners played a one-game Divisional Championship Game. The two Divisional Championship Game winners played a one-game League Championship.

=== Playoff bracket ===
Sub-Division Championship Series
1	Rockford	7	18	2
2	Kalamazoo	12	11	8
↑ Great Lakes East / ↓ Great Lakes West
1	Wausau	5	5	3
2	Madison	1	8	8
↑ Great Lakes / ↓ Great Plains
1	Duluth	6	6
2	La Crosse	12	8
↑ Great Plains East / ↓ Great Plains West
1	Willmar	13	2	0
2	St. Cloud	12	11	6

Division Championship
1	Madison	2
2	Kalamazoo	3
1	St. Cloud	1
2	La Crosse	8

Northwoods League Championship
1	Kalamazoo	8
2	La Crosse	7

== Baseball statistical leaders ==
For cumulative stats, leaders include all league players. For rate stats, leaders include only qualifiers. Qualified hitters must have 2.70 plate appearances per team game. Per NWL standards, qualified pitchers must have minimum .80 innings pitched per team game. This significantly limits the pool of those qualifying for pitching rate stats.

=== Hitting ===
Stat	Player	Team	Total
H	Andrew Sojka	Stingers	94
HR	Andrew Sojka	Stingers	22
RBI	Andrew Sojka	Stingers	73
AVG	Maddox Mihalakis	Rivets	.429
OPS	Andrew Sojka	Stingers	1.319
SB	Lucas Moore	Bucks	48

=== Pitching ===
Stat	Player	Team	Total
W	Kai Taylor, Eamon Horwedel, Connor Nolen	Larks, Growlers, Rockers	t-7
SO	Ryan Kraft	Growlers	81
SV	Justin Morgan	Battle Jacks	10

== Baseball All-Star selections ==
=== Mid-season All-Star Game ===
The 2024 Northwoods League All-Star Game was held at ISG Field in Mankato, Minnesota. The Great Lakes Division defeated the Great Plains Division 9–2. The following players were selected to participate in the game.

Great Lakes Division

Hitters
Position	Player	Team
C	Brock Leitgeb	Growlers
C	Max Soliz	Woodchucks
1B	Blake Guerin	Mallards
2B	Kyle Schupmann	Rivets
3B	Mason Hamlin	Battle Jacks
SS	Maddox Mihalkis	Rivets
IF	Isaac Webb	Woodchucks
UTL	Jake Schaffner	Mallards
UTL	Max McGwire	Rafters
UTL	JJ Dutton	Jackrabbits
OF	Parker Knoll	Dock Spiders
OF	Brayden Bakes	Rivets
OF	Max Galvin	Woodchucks
OF	Alex Fernandes	Battle Jacks
OF	Parker Picot	Leprechauns
OF	Jorge De Goti	Rafters
DH	Jack Mathey	Rafters

Pitchers
Position	Player	Team
P	Henry Chabot	Rockers
P	Eamon Horwedel	Growlers
P	Adiel Melendez	Woodchucks
P	Adrian Rubio	Battle Jacks
P	Landen Southern	Rivets
P	Jayden Dentler	Pit Spitters
P	Grant Siegel	Woodchucks
P	Jake Jekielek	Leprechauns
P	Jorge DeCardenas	Woodchucks
P	Ryan Kraft	Growlers
P	Alejandro Espinoza	Leprechauns
P	Zach Longshore	Rivets
P	Christian Morel	Rivets

Great Plains Division

Hitters
Position	Player	Team
C	Colin Hynek	Stingers
C	Augusto Mungarrieta	Honkers
1B	MJ Sweeney	Huskies
1B	Case Sanderson	La Crosse
2B	Charlie Sutherland	Huskies
3B	Kyle Hvidsten	Larks
SS	Aidan Byrne	Stingers
IF	Matthew Fleischhacker	MoonDogs
IF	Tyler Bishop	Rox
UTL	Brock Larsen	Mud Puppies
UTL	Jackson Cooke	Border Cats
OF	Andrew Sojka	Stingers
OF	Kaden Carpenter	Big Sticks
OF	Max Buettenback	Stingers
OF	Larry Edwards Jr.	Bucks
OF	Brigs Richartz	Express
DH	Ben Higdon	Rox

Pitchers
Position	Player	Team
P	Tyler Conklin	Big Sticks
P	Sam Nitzke	Big Sticks
P	Kai Taylor	Larks
P	Grant Garza	MoonDogs
P	Liam Martin	Mud Puppies
P	Kaden Pfeffer	Rox
P	JD Hennen	Stingers
P	Max Ramirez IV	Border Cats
P	Chaney Trout	Bucks
P	Phil Brennaman	Rox
P	Brandon Jaenke	Rox
P	Caden Kratz	Huskies
P	Evan Dempsey	Hot Tots

=== Full-season All-Stars ===
After the season concluded, the league announced its Post-Season All-Stars for the full regular season. This group included players who performed well over the course of the entire season. Several players were selected to both the mid-season All-Star Game and the Post-Season All-Star team.

Great Lakes Division

Hitters
Position	Player	Team
C	Jake Bold	Rockers
1B	Davis Hamilton	Mallards
2B	Shai Robinson	Mallards
3B	Maddox Mihalakis	Rivets
SS	Sam Miller	Rockers
IF	Aaron Piasecki	Pit Spitters
OF	Parker Knoll	Dock Spiders
OF	Max Galvin	Woodchucks
OF	Aidan Teel	Rafters
DH	Nick Harms	Rockers

Pitchers
Position	Player	Team
P	Ryan Kraft	Growlers
P	Liam O'Brien	Growlers
P	Eamon Horwedel	Growlers
P	Cohen Achen	Chinooks
P	Carson Plumadore	Woodchucks
P	Maddox Thornton	Rafters
P	Jayden Dentler	Pit Spitters

Great Plains Division

Hitters
Position	Player	Team
C	Luca DiPaolo	Honkers
1B	Jackson Hauge	Rox
2B	Charlie Sutherland	Huskies
3B	Kyle Hvidsten	Larks
SS	Jayden Duplantier	Huskies
IF	Case Sanderson	Loggers
OF	Brigs Richartz	Express
OF	Andrew Sojka	Stingers
OF	Kaden Carpenter	Big Sticks
OF	Max Buettenback	Stingers
DH	Ben Higdon	Rox

Pitchers
Position	Player	Team
P	Tyler Conklin	Big Sticks
P	Kai Taylor	Larks
P	Max Ramirez IV	Border Cats
P	Kaden Pfeffer	Rox
P	Chaney Trout	Bucks
P	Isaac Rohde	Huskies

== NWL alumni in MLB ==
=== MLB players who played in the NWL in 2024 ===
Name	2024 NWL team	MLB debut	MLB debut team
Lucas Spence	Rockford Rivets	7/17/2026	Houston Astros

=== 2024 MLB debuts ===
The following is a list of NWL alums who made their Major League Baseball debuts in the 2024 MLB season.

Name	MLB debut	Debut team	Former NWL team(s)	Season(s) in NWL
Graham Pauley	3/20	Padres	Loggers	2020
Victor Scott II	3/28	Cardinals	Dock Spiders	2020-21
Justin Slaten	3/30	Red Sox	Express	2018
Nick Avila	4/1	Giants	Rafters	2017
Spencer Arrighetti	4/10	Astros	Rafters	2020
Will Klein	4/28	Royals	Chinooks	2019
Joey Loperfido	4/30	Astros	Growlers	2018
Brett Harris	5/3	Athletics	Bobbers	2020
Kyle Manzardo	5/6	Guardians	Stingers	2020
Chris Roycroft	5/7	Cardinals	Larks, Booyah	2017-18, 2019
Zach DeLoach	5/22	White Sox	Woodchucks	2018
Spencer Schwellenbach	5/29	Braves	Pit Spitters	2020
Ryan Loutos	6/1	Cardinals	Dock Spiders	2020-21
Daniel Schneemann	6/2	Guardians	Rox	2017
Blake Dunn	6/4	Reds	Growlers	2020-21
Michael Peterson	6/18	Dodgers	Bombers	2015
Hayden Birdsong	6/26	Giants	Chinooks	2022
Brooks Lee	7/3	Twins	Stingers	2020
Hunter Bigge	7/9	Cubs	Huskies	2018
Jacob Wilson	7/19	Athletics	MoonDogs	2021
Will Warren	7/30	Yankees	Rox	2018
Hunter Feduccia	7/31	Dodgers	Rivets	2017
Eric Yang	7/31	Reds	Stingers	2018
Nick Sogard	8/2	Red Sox	Huskies	2018
Parker Dunshee	8/8	Braves	Woodchucks	2014
Will Wagner	8/12	Blue Jays	Kingfish	2018
Niko Kavadas	8/16	Angels	Growlers	2018
Griffin Conine	8/26	Marlins	Loggers	2016
Seth Halvorsen	8/30	Rockies	Resorters	2020
Lake Bachar	9/8	Marlins	Chinooks	2015
Isaac Collins	9/8	Brewers	Huskies	2017
Billy Cook	9/8	Pirates	Border Cats,Rafters	2018, 2020

=== Awards and highlights ===
NWL alums selected the 2024 MLB All-Star Game:

- Pete Alonso (Madison Mallards, 2014)
- Chris Sale (La Crosse Loggers, 2008)
- Marcus Semien (Alexandria Beetles, 2009–10)
- Matt Strahm (Rochester Honkers, 2011)

NWL alums awarded with a 2024 Cy Young Award:

- Chris Sale (La Crosse Loggers, 2008)

NWL alums awarded with a 2024 Gold Glove:

- Matt Chapman (La Crosse Loggers, 2012)
- Chris Sale (La Crosse Loggers, 2008)
- Daulton Varsho (Eau Claire Express, 2015–16)

NWL alums who were members of the World Series-winning Dodgers:

- Austin Barnes (St. Cloud River Bats, 2010)
- Alex Vesia (Mankato MoonDogs, 2016)

== Softball season overview ==
=== Background ===
The 2024 season was the first season of Northwoods League Softball (NWLS). There were 4 inaugural softball teams—the La Crosse Steam, Madison Night Mares, Mankato Habaneros, and Minot Honeybees—all playing in one single division and without a playoff.

=== Season highlights ===
The very first NWLS game was held at Copeland Park in La Crosse on 6/15/2024. The Steam beat the Night Mares 2-1, with MacKenzie Willis getting the win and the first strikout in the first inning. Madison's Hilary Blomberg had the first at-bat in NWLS history, hitting a single for the circuit's first hit. The first run came in the top of the fifth, with Madison's Addie Blomberg driving in Tia Durst. The Steam struck back with two runs in the bottom of the inning and La Crosse held on for the victory.

The Mankato Habaneros ultimately finished the season with 31-17 (.738) record, significantly better than the next best, Madison at 25-17 (.595). As there was no playoff in the inaugural season, the Habaneros were crowned the first champion in NWLS history.

=== Individual highlights ===
Paige Zender of the Habaneros won the first NWSL Player of the Year award after winning the Triple Crown. In 40 games (127 at-bats), she batted .417 with a 1.404 OPS. Additionally, she led the league in home runs (15), RBI (60), and tied for the league lead in walks (29).

Mackenzie Willis of the Steam was the Northwoods League Softball Pitcher of the Year, leading the league in ERA (2.10 ERA) and striking out a league-high 129 batters in 118.2 innings pitched. She finished the season with 11 wins in 18 starts and also tallied three saves.

Amity White of the Habaneros set an individual NWLS record with 27 stolen bases in the regular season, a record that still stands as of the end of the 2026 season. She also led the league with 48 runs scored in 2024. White was named to the full-season All-Star team that was announced after the season concluded.

== Softball standings ==
=== Regular season standings ===
Pos	Team	G	W	L	Pct.
1	Mankato Habaneros	42	31	11	.738
2	Madison Night Mares	42	25	17	.595
3	La Crosse Steam	42	17	25	.405
4	Minot Honeybees	41	10	31	.244

== Softball statistical leaders ==
For cumulative stats, leaders include all league players. For average stats, leaders include only qualifiers. Per NWL softball standards, qualified hitters must have 2.00 plate appearances per team game and qualified pitchers must have minimum 1.0 innings pitched per team game.

=== Hitting ===
Stat	Player	Team	Total
AVG	Paige Zender	Habaneros	.417
OPS	Paige Zender	Habaneros	1.404
HR	Paige Zender	Habaneros	15
RBIs	Paige Zender	Habaneros	60
SB	Amity White	Habaneros	27

=== Pitching ===
Stat	Player	Team	Total
W	Jayme Scheck	Habaneros	12
ERA	Mackenzie Willis	Steam	2.06
SO	Mackenzie Willis	Steam	129
SV	Mackenzie Willis	Steam	3

== Softball Post-Season All-Star selections ==
The following players were selected to the 2024 NWLS Post-Season All-Star Team.

Position	Player	Team
C	Avary Makarewicz	Steam
1B/UTL	Jackie Albrecht	Honeybees
2B	Carly Oliver	Night Mares
3B/UTL	Hilary Blomberg	Night Mares
SS	Tia Durst	Night Mares
UTL	Paige Zender	Habaneros
UTL	Jessa Snippes	Habaneros
OF	Sailor Hall	Habaneros
OF	Amity White	Habaneros
OF	Addie Blomberg	Night Mares
P	Mackenzie Willis	Steam
P	Karlie McKenzie	Night Mares
P	Jayme Scheck	Habaneros

== See also ==
- 2024 Major League Baseball season
- 2024 Prospect League season
