= Madison Night Mares =

Softball team in Wisconsin, United States

Information
- League: Northwoods League
- Location: Madison, Wisconsin
- Ballpark: Warner Park
- Founded: 2024
- League championships: (2) 2025, 2026
- Colors: Teal, yellow, brown, dark gray
- Ownership: Steve Schmitt
- President: Vern Stenman
- General manager: Samantha Rubin

The Madison Night Mares are a fastpitch softball team that plays in the softball branch of the collegiate summer Northwoods League, also known as Northwoods League Softball (NWLS). The Night Mares play their home games at Warner Park in Madison, Wisconsin.

== History ==
In May 2023, the Northwoods League announced that they were creating a summer collegiate softball league to begin play in 2024. Explaining the rationale, co-founder Kathy Radatz said “We have seen tremendous growth in interest in women’s softball in recent years, and we are excited to be able to provide a platform for female athletes to continue to hone their skills and compete at a high level during the summer months.”

In January 2024, the ownership group of the Madison Mallards announced that they would be creating a collegiate summer softball team to participate in the first season of the NWLS, with plans to equip Warner Park with an artificial turf infield, a portable pitcher's mound, and a movable outfield fence.

In conjunction with Madison being announced as one of the inaugural NWLS franchises, the team launched a submit-a-name campaign that yielded four finalists: Swamp Angels, Thunder Chickens, Lake Muensters, and Night Mares. Night Mares was chosen as the team identity, with logos depicting a mare and a color schedule centered around black, white, and teal.

=== 2024 season ===
In summer 2024, Madison joined with the La Crosse Steam, Mankato Habaneros, and Minot Honeybees in the inaugural season of the upstart softball league. Madison finished the season with a 25–17 record, good for second place. Five Night Mares were named to the league's post-season All-Star team, tying the number of those selected by the championship-winning Mankato Habaneros. Sisters Hilary and Addie Blomberg were both selected as all-stars after their excellent 2024 seasons.

=== 2025 season ===
In 2025, NWLS expanded to five teams with the addition of Wausau, Wisconsin, and held the league's first playoff series. In the regular season, Madison posted a record of 35–7, significantly better than the next best team at 21-21. They swept a 3-game playoff series against Minot and won their first NWLS championship.

The 2025 Night Mares had several individual players with excellent seasons, with a league-leading six players named to the post-season all-star team. Hilary Blomberg won NWLS Player of Year after leading the league in home runs (11) and RBI (47), as well as maintaining a .407 batting average on the season. Karlie McKenzie won NWLS Pitcher of the Year after leading the league in ERA (1.86) and wins (10) as well as tallying 59 strikouts. As of the end of the 2026 season, McKenzie's 1.86 ERA is the all-time NWLS single season record. Lexi Godwin was named NWLS Coach of the Year after leading the team to their excellent regular season record and championship victory.

=== 2026 season ===
In 2026, the Night Mares won their first 16 games in a row before finally falling to the Wausau Ignite 13–10 in the first game of June 28 doubleheader. They ultimately set an NWLS record for full season wins, finishing at 36–6.

In June, former pitcher Paytn Monticelli became the first NWLS alum to play professional softball, debuting with the Atlanta Smoke of the Professional Softball League. Monticelli pitched for the Night Mares in 2025, in the summer between her junior year at Oklahoma and senior year at LSU.

The Ignite finished the season with a 21–19 record, earning the right to compete with Madison for the NWLS championship in a best of three series. Game 1 was held in Wausau on 8/3, with the Night Mares winning 3–1. Game 2 was held in Madison on 8/5, with the Night Mares winning 7–1, sweeping the Ignite and winning their second consecutive NWLS championship.

The 2026 Night Mares had several individual players with excellent seasons, with a league-leading eight players selected to the All-Star Game (held at Warner Park) as well as the post-season all-star team. Hilary Blomberg won NWLS Player of Year for the second year in a row, setting a new NWLS home run record with 20. She also led the league in RBI (59) and batting average (.471) among full-season players. Ryan Maddox won the NWLS Pitcher of the Year award, leading the league in ERA (3.37) and tying the lead with 10 wins. Kara Hammock was named NWLS Co-Coach of Year after leading the Night Mares to their record season of success.

== Player highlights ==
=== Full-season All-Stars ===
The following players have been selected as NWLS Post-Season All Stars, honoring their performance over the course of the full softball season.

Year	Player	Pos.	College
2024	Carly Oliver	2B	Cumberlands
2024	Tia Durst	SS	Washington
2024	Hilary Blomberg	3B/UTL	Wisconsin
2024	Addie Blomberg	OF	South Dakota State
2024	Karlie McKenzie	P	Eastern Illinois
2025	Emma Kavanagh	1B/UTL	Arizona
2025	Hilary Blomberg	UTL	Wisconsin
2025	Ava Carroll	OF	Washington
2025	Ella Stephenson	OF	Michigan
2025	Paytn Monticelli	P	LSU
2025	Karlie McKenzie	P	Eastern Illinois
2026	Hilary Blomberg	C	Wisconsin
2026	Tele Jennings	1B	Arizona
2026	Mickayla Tosch	SS	Wichita State
2026	Ava Carroll	OF	Washington
2026	Danielle Lucey	OF	Wisconsin
2026	Ryan Maddox	P	Washington
2026	Andrea Jaskowiak	P	Colorado State
2026	Kendall Weik	P	NC State

=== Awards ===
The following league-wide awards have been given to Night Mares:

NWLS Player of the Year

- 2025 - Hilary Blomberg
- 2026 - Hilary Blomberg

NWLS Pitcher of the Year

- 2025 - Karlie McKenzie
- 2026 - Ryan Maddox

NWLS Coach of the Year

- 2025 - Lexi Godwin
- 2026 - Kara Hammock

=== NWLS single-season records ===
The following all-time NWLS single season records are held by Night Mares as of end of 2026 season:

	Stat	Player	#	Season
Hitting	On-base plus slugging	Hilary Blomberg	1.553	2026
Hitting	Runs scored	Ava Carroll	62	2026
Hitting	Hits	Hilary Blomberg	65	2026
Hitting	Home runs	Hilary Blomberg	20	2026
Pitching	ERA	Karlie McKenzie	1.86	2025

Hitting rate stat qualifiers require minimum of 2.00 plate appearances per team game. Pitching rate stat qualifiers require minimum of 1.00 innings pitched per team game. Cumulative stats include all NWLS players in a given season.
