= Minot Honeybees =

Softball team in North Dakota, United States

Information
- League: Northwoods League
- Location: Minot, North Dakota
- Ballpark: Corbett Field
- Founded: 2024
- Colors: Yellow, black, gold, red
- Ownership: John Bollinger, Terry Daffinrud, Glenn Bosch, Bryan Vibeto, Jarid Lundeen
- General manager: Monica Hocking
- Website: northwoodsleague.com/minot-honeybees

The Minot Honeybees are a fastpitch softball team that plays in the softball branch of the collegiate summer Northwoods League, also known as Northwoods League Softball (NWLS). The Honeybees play their home games at Corbett Field in Minot, North Dakota.The team shares an ownership group and ballpark with the NWL's Minot Hot Tots, with field modifications made for conversion between softball and baseball.

== History ==
=== Background ===
In May 2023, the Northwoods League announced that they were creating a summer collegiate softball league to begin play in 2024. Explaining the rationale, co-founder Kathy Radatz said “We have seen tremendous growth in interest in women’s softball in recent years, and we are excited to be able to provide a platform for female athletes to continue to hone their skills and compete at a high level during the summer months.”

In January 2024, the team announced the Honeybees name and unveiled their branding. In a press release, the team stated that "the Minot Honeybees draw inspiration from the industrious and collaborative nature of honeybees, which are known for their teamwork, dedication, and resilience. The new name aims to capture the essence of the team’s spirit both on and off the field. As part of the rebranding, Minot Softball has revealed a vibrant and distinctive set of logos. The logos showcase a dynamic interplay of colors and shapes, reflecting the energy and dynamism of the team."

=== 2024 season ===
In 2024, Minot joined with teams in Madison, Wisconsin; La Crosse, Wisconsin; and Mankato, Minnesota in the inaugural season of the upstart softball league. The Honeybees finished the 2024 season with a record of 10-31, the lowest winning percentage among the four teams. In July, the Honeybees played a doubleheader in Bismarck against the Madison Night Mares. As both Bismarck and Madison are state capitals, the series was called the "Capital City Classic."

=== 2025 season ===
In 2025, the Honeybees went 21-21, taking second place in the five-team circuit (now including the Wausau Ignite) and qualifying for the playoffs. In post-season play, they lost the NWLS Championship game to the Madison Night Mares.

=== 2026 season ===
In the 2026 season, the Honeybees had a 13-29 record. This was the worst record among the six teams (now including the Grand Forks Spitfires) and they did not qualify for the playoffs.

== Player highlights ==
=== Full-season All-Stars ===
The following Honeybees have been selected as NWLS Post-Season All Stars, honoring their performance over the course of the full softball season.

Year	Player	Pos.	College
2024	Jackie Albrecht	1B/UTL	North Dakota
2025	Julianna Verni	P	Syracuse
2025	Taylor Chillingworth	SS	San Jose State
2025	Bella Cimino	3B	North Florida
2025	Trinity Gregg	OF	Jamestown
2026	Ellen Tarjan	3B	Adelphi
2026	Sara Simon	SS	West Liberty
2026	Clare Rettler	OF	Carthage
2026	Bridget Chapman	UTL	Delaware
2026	Parker Rowden	P	Lafayette
2026	Madi Balk	P	Washington
