= Wausau Ignite =

Softball team in Wisconsin, United States

Information
- League: Northwoods League
- Location: Wausau, Wisconsin
- Ballpark: Athletic Park
- Founded: 2025
- Colors: Dark blue, light blue, sky blue, green
- Ownership: Mark MacDonald
- President: Ryan Treu
- General manager: Brianne Barta
- Website: northwoodsleague.com/wausau-ignite

The Wausau Ignite are a fastpitch softball team that plays in the softball branch of the collegiate summer Northwoods League, also known as Northwoods League Softball (NWLS). The Ignite play their home games at Athletic Park in Wausau, Wisconsin. The team shares the ballpark with the NWL's Wausau Woodchucks, with field modifications made for conversion between softball and baseball.

== History ==
=== Background ===
In May 2023, the Northwoods League announced that they were creating a summer collegiate softball league to begin play in 2024. Explaining the rationale, co-founder Kathy Radatz said “We have seen tremendous growth in interest in women’s softball in recent years, and we are excited to be able to provide a platform for female athletes to continue to hone their skills and compete at a high level during the summer months.” In 2024, the first season of the NWLS included the Madison Night Mares, La Crosse Steam, Mankato Habaneros, and Minot Honeybees.

In 2025, the Ignite were included as an expansion team, under the ownership of Mark MacDonald, owner of the Wausau Woodchucks. In April 2025, the Ignite unveiled their name, colors, and logos. The nickname refers to a wish to "ignite a passion for women's sports across the country." The primary logo features an owl with aurora borealis and night sky imagery on its wings. The owl's wings each have five feathers, with one representing the number of NWLS teams at the time of the Ignite's inception. Team colors are blue and green, with blue representing the "Wisconsin River flowing through Wausau" and green representing the "trees and nature connected to Central Wisconsin."

=== 2025 season ===
The Ignite's 2025 inaugural season record was 12–30, last place among the five teams and falling short of NWLS playoff qualification. Infielder Riley Schwisow had an excellent season, being named to the NWLS full season All-Star team after hitting .414 (1.374 OPS) and leading the league in triples with 5. As of the end of the 2026 season, she is tied for the NWLS all-time single-season triples record.

=== 2026 season ===
In 2026, the Ignite finished the season with a 21-19 record, good for second place in NWLS. They earned the right to compete against the juggernaut Madison Night Mares for the NWLS championship in a best of three series. Game 1 was held in Wausau on 8/3, with the Night Mares winning 3-1. Game 2 was held in Madison on 8/5, with the Night Mares winning 7-1 and sweeping the Ignite.

2026 was marked by some individual standout performances in Wausau. Four Ignite players were named to the inaugural NWLS midseason All-Star Game and four were also selected to the 2026 full-season All-Star Team. Mia Johnson appeared on both lists, finishing the season with a .461 batting average and 1.542 OPS. Her slugging percentage (1.016) led the league and set a new NWLS all-time single-season record. Another record was set by infielder Megan McGinnis. Although she only appeared in about half of Wausau's games, she met minimum qualifications for season stats (2 plate appearances per team game) and tallied 30 hits in 60 at-bats. Her even .500 batting average set a new NWLS all-time single season record.

== Player highlights ==
=== Full-season All-Stars ===
The following players have been selected as NWLS Post-Season All Stars, honoring their performance over the course of the full softball season.

Year	Player	Pos.	College
2025	Riley Schwisow	2B	Northwestern State
2025	Mia Johnson	UTL	Wisconsin-Parkside
2026	Marley Teasley	2B	Washington
2026	Riley Schwisow	3B	Northwestern State
2026	Mia Johnson	UTL	Wisconsin-Parkside
2026	Zoey Mills	P	Eastern Florida State

=== NWLS single-season records ===
The following all-time NWLS single season records are held by Ignite players as of the end of the 2026 season:

Stat	Player	#	Season
Batting average	Megan McGinnis	.500	2026
Slugging percentage	Mia Johnson	1.016	2026
Triples	Riley Schwisow	5 (tie)	2025

Hitting rate stat qualifiers require minimum of 2.00 plate appearances per team game. Cumulative stats include all NWLS players in a given season.
