= Memorial Park (Royal Oak, Michigan) =

Baseball stadium in Royal Oak, Michigan

- Location within Michigan
- Location: Royal Oak, Michigan
- Coordinates: 42°31′10″N 83°11′4″W
- Area: 24.19 acres (9.79 ha)
- Opened: June 26, 1939
- Operator: City of Royal Oak
- Open: 6:00 a.m. - 11:00 p.m.

Memorial Park is a municipal park in Royal Oak, Michigan. Covering just over 24-acres, it was dedicated in 1939 to Michigan Armed Forces members who died in military service. Memorial Park has facilities for baseball, softball, football, and tennis; a playground; a pavilion and picnic tables; restrooms; and concessions. Dogs are not allowed in the park.

== The Michigan WWII Legacy Memorial ==
Memorial Park is the home of the Michigan WWII Legacy Memorial, a "tribute to Michigan's home front and warfront heroes [who] helped win World War II."

A copy of the statue Unconditional Surrender was displayed in Memorial Park from June to December 2016, to help raise money for the memorial.

== Memorial Park riot ==
The 1970 Memorial Park riot was a three-day civil disturbance by alienated white youths that began on August 24, 1970. The initial conflict resulted from the police closing Memorial Park, alleging that the park was being used for the sale of illegal drugs.

== Ballpark ==
The Lucky Corner
- Interactive map of The Lucky Corner
- Address: 31050 Woodward Ave. Royal Oak, Michigan
- Coordinates: 42°31′10″N 83°11′4″W
- Field size: Left field: 320 ft (98 m); Left center: 385 ft (117 m); Center field: 375 ft (114 m); Right center: 385 ft (117 m); Right field: 320 ft (98 m)

Tenant
- Royal Oak Leprechauns (GLSCL/NWL) 2021–present

Among the features of Memorial Park is a baseball stadium, in some sources called The Lucky Corner, which has been home to the Royal Oak Leprechauns, a collegiate summer baseball team, since 2021. The Leprechauns have played in the Northwoods League since 2024, having been members of the Great Lakes Summer Collegiate League from 2021 to 2023.
