= Albrecht Field =

Softball stadium

- Location within North Dakota Location within the United States
- Interactive map of Albrecht Field
- Address: 2500 Red Jarrett Way; Grand Forks, North Dakota
- Coordinates: 47.921201°N 97.064228°W
- Capacity: 895
- Surface: Turf
- Scoreboard: LED videoboard
- Record attendance: 1,200 (September 21, 2024, vs. NW Missouri State)

Construction
- Groundbreaking: October 2023
- Opened: September 21, 2024
- Architect: ICON Architects
- General contractors: Community Contractors, Inc.

Tenants
- North Dakota Fighting Hawks (Summit League) 2025–present Grand Forks Spitfires (Northwoods League) 2025–present

Website
- Albrecht Field

Albrecht Field is the home field of the North Dakota Fighting Hawks softball team of the University of North Dakota. The stadium is located at 2500 Red Jarrett Way, on the university's Grand Forks, North Dakota campus. It was designed by ICON Architects with groundbreaking in October 2023 and was completed in 2024. The field is named for donors Dave and Alexa Albrecht whose daughter pitched in the stadium's first game. The ballpark has an official seating capacity of 895, though the first game on September 21, 2024 had a reported attendance of 1,200. The first season of softball was played there in 2025. The stadium is also home field for the Grand Forks Spitfires collegiate softball team in the Northwoods League.
