= 1970 Memorial Park riot =

Civil disturbance

1970 Memorial Park riots
- Date: August 24–27, 1970
- Location: Oakland County, Michigan
- Caused by: Police shutting down a park popular with youths

Parties
| Local youths | Law enforcement |

Number
| 2000 | |

Casualties
- Injuries: Several
- Arrested: 754

The 1970 Memorial Park riot was a civil disturbance by alienated white youths that began in Royal Oak, Michigan, on August 24, 1970, and spread to Birmingham, Michigan, both primarily white middle class suburbs of Detroit. The initial conflict resulted from the closure by police of Memorial Park in Royal Oak. Authorities said that the park was being used as a marketplace for the sale of illegal drugs. The riot lasted for three days, and led to the formation of several youth controlled social service organizations.

== Background ==
Memorial Park had become a gathering place for members of the counterculture and youth who were interested in social issues and music. In the summer of 1969, a youth group called Youth for Peace, Freedom and Justice began holding communal suppers in the park, and also obtained a permit for free film showings in the park, including films produced by The Newsreel film collective.

Antiwar discussions were often held at the park. On May 6, 1970, a demonstration at the downtown Royal Oak draft board office occurred. Five youths were arrested, and a policeman and three protesters were slightly injured.

By the summer of 1970, Memorial Park was well known as a gathering place for local youths.

Officials stated that the youths had a "protective attitude" toward the public park. The youths had gone through community channels to create activity options for local youth. Fifteen "hippie-garbed" undercover police officers infiltrated the scene at the park, documenting illegal drug use.

== Closure of Memorial Park and first night of rioting ==
On the evening of Monday, August 24, 1970, the Royal Oak Police Department closed Memorial Park and ordered the people in the park to disperse. Some of the police officers were "firing revolvers in the air" when they entered the park.

In response to the park's closure, a March to the Park was organized. A few hundred youths were held back from entering the public park by police. The youth staged a sit in and began to sing songs. A four-hour stand off with the police occurred that night. Some youths responded by throwing bottles and rocks and breaking windows on Woodward Avenue, one of the main traffic arteries in the Detroit metropolitan area.

Mrs. Ralph Akens, a woman living adjacent to the park, asked, "How would you like 500 trashy hippies across the street from you?", and supported an indefinite closure of the park.

== Second night of rioting ==
On Tuesday night, the rioting spread north and south along Woodward Avenue. Royal Oak officials imposed a curfew lasting from 7:00 p.m. to 5:00 a.m. By the end of the second night of rioting, approximately 100 youths had been arrested.

== Third night of rioting ==
Because of the curfew imposed in Royal Oak, a crowd of 1000 angry youth gathered on Wednesday night in Birmingham to the north, at that city's border with Royal Oak. There, they confronted a number of local city police departments at the Royal Oak city limits and clashes ensued with police. In response, the city of Birmingham also imposed a curfew on Wednesday night, due to "rioting, disturbances and destruction of property". The "tight curfews" were successful in reducing the violence, along with mass arrests of youths on the streets. City officials considered asking for assistance from the National Guard if the curfews arrests were not effective in ending the rioting, but that was not necessary.

It was estimated that up to 2000 youths had participated in the rioting, and at least 564 were arrested.

One police officer suffered a possible broken shoulder due to a thrown rock, and another was cut by flying glass when windows on both sides of his squad car were broken by rocks.

== Fourth day developments and curfew arrests ==
On Thursday, August 27, a newly formed youth group called the People's Defense Committee called a press conference at the Record House in Ferndale, Michigan, to discuss a legal response to the arrests. An organization called Birmingham Youth Assistance also called for a meeting of concerned youth. A group of seven youth leaders had a meeting with Royal Oak city officials.

Although no violence occurred on Thursday night, there were about 90 arrests for curfew violations. The curfews were lifted later that night because the violence had ended.

== Young Peoples Coalition and Center House ==
In the aftermath of the riots, an organization called the Young People's Coalition was formed and controlled by the disaffected youth, with the assistance of the Family Service Agency of Oakland County, Michigan. The People's Defense Committee entered this coalition, with support from employees of a local business called the Record House, which sold rock and roll music. The coalition's goal was to "relate to the street people who are involved with the drug abuse problem", and the group recognized that the issues had a political basis.

The coalition planned a "drop-in center" and "rap line", and announced a fundraising drive with an initial goal of $1,400.00. One organizer, 17-year-old Pamela Applin, said, "I'd like to see people communicate at a higher level than throwing rocks and arguing." Another organizer, 18-year-old Denny Bastin, said that "We'd like people to talk about what's really inside them." They spoke out against gender discrimination in the schools, said Bastin, and the tendency of society to discriminate against disaffected youth for their "beliefs, looks and actions", said Applin, who urged that the youth be judged as individuals rather than as a whole.

The rap line operation was under operation in Ferndale in 1971 under the name "Center House". Young People's Coalition organizer Jim Heaphy said, "We get calls on drug abuse, general rap problems, parents, jobs, suicides, draft and legal information, all kinds of different things. We refer a lot of callers to other agencies." The Young People's Coalition also operated a drop-in center at the YMCA in Royal Oak, a coffee house in the YWCA in Ecorse, Michigan, and an anonymous drug analysis program. A free clinic at Center House opened in July, 1971. Financial support was provided by local businesses serving the counterculture, including the Record House, the Speakeasy Boutique, The Happy Apple, the Unisex Shop and the Waterbed Store.

== 1971 baseball bust ==
On Sunday, April 25, 1971, youths attempted to re-open access to the park by holding a baseball game there. Five police squad cars and a paddy wagon responded, and arrested 21 youths. The People's Defense Committee promptly mobilized lawyers and bail bondsmen to provide assistance to those arrested. A demonstration of 100 youths was held outside the Royal Oak police station, but the police announced their intention to continue arresting youths who gathered at the park. The city council and police had joined forces to keep their city free from the "freaks".

== See also ==
- List of incidents of civil unrest in the United States
