= Ethan Surowiec =

American baseball player (born 2005)

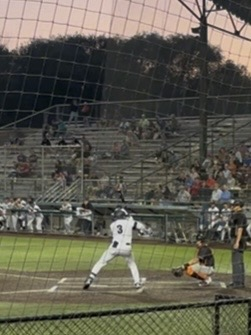

Florida Gators – No. 10
- Infielder
- Born: June 26, 2005 (age 21); Shreveport, Louisiana
- Bats: Right Throws: Right

Teams
- Florida (2026-present); Duluth Huskies (2025); Mississippi (2025)

Career highlights and awards
- Northwoods League Most Valuable Player (2025)

Ethan Matthew Surowiec (born June 26, 2005) is an American college baseball infielder for the Florida Gators.

== Early life and high school ==
Surowiec was born in Shreveport, Louisiana and raised in Gulfport, Mississippi. He attended Gulfport High School and played baseball all four years under coach Jamie MacMahon. He was a two-time All-State recipient.

Upon graduation from high school, he was ranked 89th overall high school prospect by Perfect Game, as well as 7th best 3rd baseman and 3rd best prospect in Mississippi. He committed to the University of Mississippi.

== College career ==
Surowiec majored in business at Mississippi and appeared in 11 games as a freshman, hitting .375 with two home runs and eight RBI. His first collegiate hit was on 3/11/25 at South Alabama. After his freshman year, he entered the transfer portal and signed with the University of Florida.

In summer 2025, Surowiec played for the Duluth Huskies of the Northwoods League (NWL). He was named to the mid-season all-star team, and hit a home run in his lone at-bat in the all-star game. He would go on have an outstanding season in the NWL, earning league MVP honors. He appeared in 53 games with 204 at-bats that season, leading the league in home runs (17), RBI (68), and OPS (1.255). He would go on to lead the Huskies to the 2025 Northwoods League Championship. In the deciding game, Surowiec went 1-3 with a home run and scored twice, but the Huskies fell to Green Bay 10-8.

Surowiec had an excellent sophomore season at Florida. He was the lone Gator to start all 62 games, and led the team in hits (78), batting average (.317), RBI (63), total bases (130) and at bats (246). In Florida's SEC baseball tournament victory over Alabama on May 21, 2026, he went 4-for-5 with one homer, two doubles, three RBI and three runs scored.

In the summer after his sophomore season, Surowiec was invited to participate in the MLB Draft Combine, despite his remaining NCAA eligibility. After the draft, he announced that he was signing an NIL deal with Florida and would return to the Gators for his junior year.
