= Royal Oak Leprechauns =

Baseball team

- Logo

Information
- League: Northwoods League (Great Lakes East 2024-pres)
- Location: Royal Oak, Michigan
- Ballpark: Memorial Park (Royal Oak, Michigan) (2021-present)
- Founded: 2015
- Division championships: 1 (2026)
- League championships: 1 (2026)
- Former name: Irish Hills Leprechauns (2015-2018)
- Former league: Great Lakes Summer Collegiate League (2015-2023)
- Former ballpark: Siena Heights Baseball Diamond (2015-2018)
- Colors: Dark Green, Kelly Green, King's Gold
- Mascot: Paddy O'Dinger
- Management: General Manager: Danny Weiss; President: DJ LeMahieu; Director of Sales: Kurt Borngesser; Community Engagement Director and Secretary: David Lambert
- Manager: DJ LeMahieu
- Website: Official website

The Royal Oak Leprechauns are a summer collegiate baseball team in the Northwoods League. They are based in Royal Oak, Michigan, and play their home games at Memorial Park.

== History ==
Founded in 2015, the team began playing in the Great Lakes Summer Collegiate League (GLSCL) in 2016 as the Irish Hills Leprechauns, based in Adrian, Michigan. They remained in Adrian through the 2018 season and went on hiatus during the 2019 season.

In 2020, MLB All-Star and Gold Glove winning infielder D.J. LeMahieu began supporting the Leprechauns as a primary donor, funding numerous renovations to Memorial Park in Royal Oak. The relocated Leprechauns resumed play in the GLSCL in 2021, changing their name to the Royal Oak Leprechauns. LeMahieu later transitioned to the role of team President and eventually Field Manager.

In October 2023, it was announced that the Leprechauns would be leaving the GLSCL and joining the Northwoods League (NWL), another summer collegiate league, for the 2024 season.

In 2026, the Leprechauns had a standout season in the NWL. Managed by D.J. LeMahieu, they finished the regular season with a 43-27 record and clinched a playoff berth with the best second half record in the Great Lakes East division. In the sub-division championship series, they swept the Kenosha Kingfish before defeating the Madison Mallards for the Great Lakes division championship. They faced the St. Cloud Rox in a winner-take-all NWL championship game on 8/13/26. Both teams were held scoreless through six innings, with Jack Sequin on the mound for the Leps. The Rox scored one run in the 7th, and the Leprechauns got on the board in the 8th with a 2-RBI single by Luke Kosko. The Leprechauns defeated the Rox by a score of 3-1.

2026 was also a successful individual season for several Leprechaun players. Three Leps (Luke Kosko, Oliver Service, Kellen English) were selected to represent the Great Lakes Division in the NWL All-Star game, held at Field of Dreams Ballpark in Dyersville, Iowa. Upon completion of the regular season, outfielder Luke Kosko led all NWL players in both home runs (17) and RBI (72). Pitcher Spencer Boynton led all NWL pitchers in total strikeouts with 76. Kosko was named 2026 Northwoods League Most Valuable Player. Additionally, infielder Mason Barth, Boynton, and Kosko were all named to the NWL full-season All-Star team which was announced after the season.

== Season-by-season results ==
Season	Wins	Losses	Pct	Playoffs
Great Lakes Summer Collegiate League
2016	22	20	.524	Did not qualify
2017	16	26	.381	Did not qualify
2018	19	22	.463	Did not qualify
2021	23	19	.548	Did not qualify
2022	17	21	.447	Did not qualify
2023	17	21	.447	Did not qualify
Northwoods League
2024	34	38	.472	Did not qualify
2025	35	37	.486	Did not qualify
2026	43	29	.597	Subdivision Championship: Beat the Kenosha Kingfish 2 games to 0. Division Championship: Beat the Madison Mallards 6-1; League Championship: Beat the St. Cloud Rox 3-1

== Yearly Attendance ==
Year	Attendance
2024	26,206
2025	30,367
2026	19,692

== Northwoods League All-Stars ==
The following players have been selected to either the Northwoods League mid-season All-Star Game and/or the full-season All-Star Team.

Player	Position	College	Year	Mid-season or full-season
Parker Picot	OF	Alabama	2024	Mid-season
Jake Jekielek	P	Northwood	2024	Mid-season
Alejandro Espinoza	P	Central Michigan	2024	Mid-season
Ryan Tyranski	1B	Cincinnati	2025	Both
Oliver Service	C	Marshall	2026	Both
Luke Kosko	OF	Cincinnati	2026	Both
Kellen English	P	Indiana	2026	Mid-season
Spencer Boynton	P	Valparaiso	2026	Full-season
Mason Barth	3B	Notre Dame	2026	Full-season

== Leprechauns in professional baseball ==
The following former Leprechauns have signed with Major League Baseball organizations:

Name	Season(s) with Leps	NWL or GLSCL	MLB signing team
Jake Hoover	2016	GLSCL	Texas Rangers
Griffin Lockwood-Powell	2017	GLSCL	Los Angeles Dodgers
Sam Benschoter	2018	GLSCL	Cincinnati Reds
Pierce Banks	2018	GLSCL	Minnesota Twins
Derek Clark	2021	GLSCL	Los Angeles Angels
Trent Farquhar	2021	GLSCL	Philadelphia Phillies
Zach MacDonald	2021	GLSCL	Detroit Tigers
Griffin Kilander	2022/2024	Both	Boston Red Sox
Brayden Dowd	2023-2024	Both	Arizona Diamondbacks
Jake Jekielek	2024	NWL	Texas Rangers
Aidan Cremarosa	2024	NWL	Tampa Bay Rays
Jake Shelagowski	2025	NWL	St. Louis Cardinals
