= North Dakota Fighting Hawks softball =

North Dakota Fighting Hawks
- University: University of North Dakota
- Head coach: Jordan Stevens (5th season)
- Conference: Summit League
- Location: Grand Forks, North Dakota, US
- Home stadium: Albrecht Field
- Nickname: Fighting Hawks
- Colors: Kelly green and white

The North Dakota Fighting Hawks softball team is a part of the athletic program at the University of North Dakota in Grand Forks, North Dakota. They are members of the NCAA Division I Summit League. The program only includes a women's team. The current Fighting Hawks softball head coach is Jordan Stevens.

== Head coaches ==
#	Name	Term
1	Patricia Warcup	1977–1982
2	Cindy Corlett	1983
3	Shelly Hughes	1984
4	Dona Corcoran-Zanotti	1985
5	Janna Hjelseth	1986–1987
6	Cindy Cortese	1998
7	Doreen Zierer	1989–1990
8	Charlotte "Chickie" Mason	1991
9	Scott Steen	1992–1993
10	Denise Robinson	1994–1996
11	Paula Sondreal	1997–2001
12	Tracy Marback	2002–2007
13	Sami Strinz	2008–2010
14	Eric Oakley	2011–2014
15	Jordan Stevens	2015–present

== Ballparks ==
- Apollo Park, 2007–2024
- Albrecht Field, 2025–present

== Championships ==
2010 Great West Conference Tournament.

== See also ==
- List of NCAA Division I softball programs
