= Athletic Park (Wausau) =

Baseball stadium in Wausau, Wisconsin, US

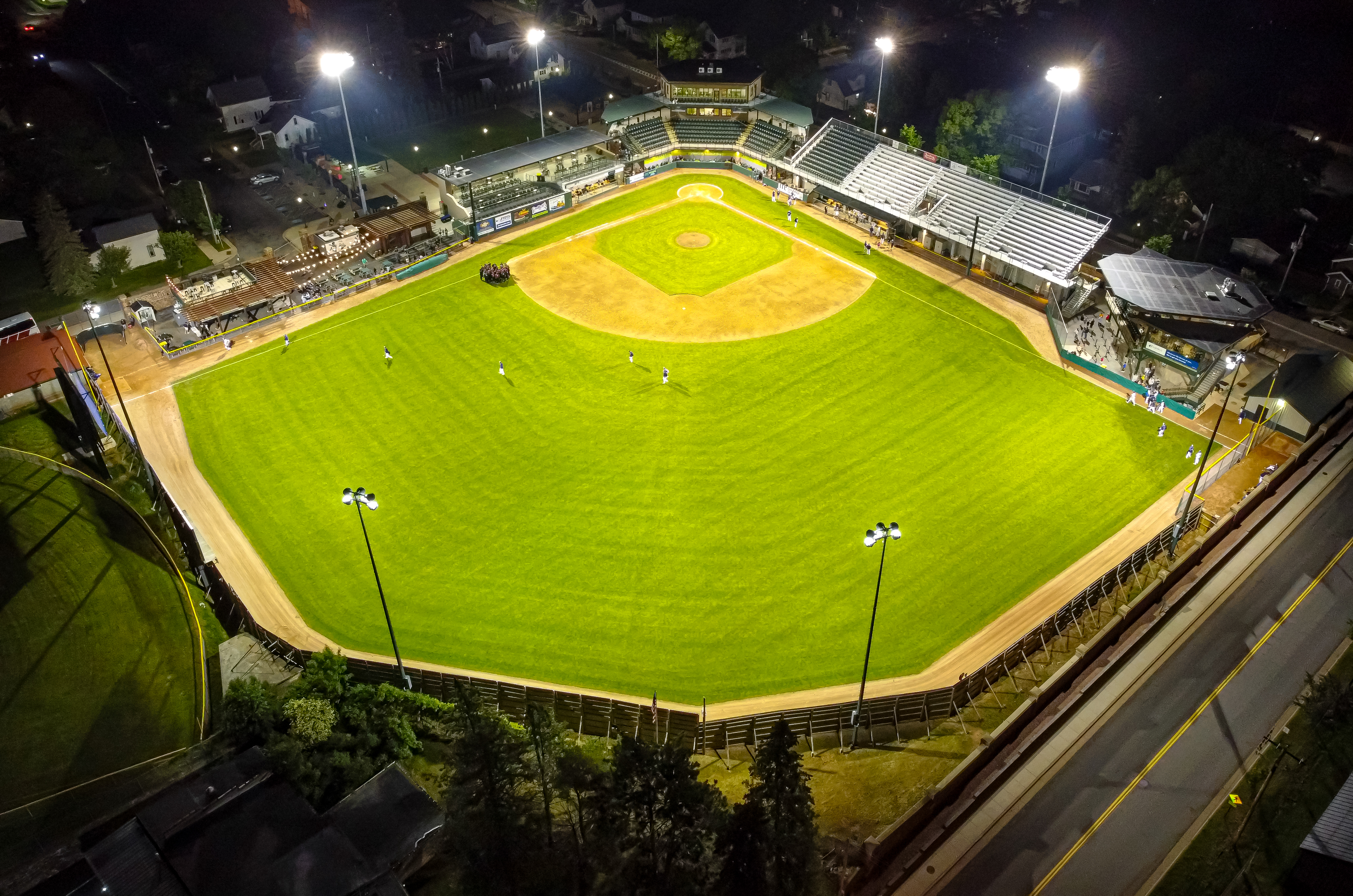
- Athletic Park in 2024
- Interactive map of Athletic Park
- Location: 324 E. Wausau Ave. Wausau, WI 54403
- Coordinates: 44°58′28.74″N 89°37′34.91″W
- Owner: City of Wausau
- Capacity: 2,500 (1946); 4,400 (1951); 2,500 (1987); 7,000 (2013)
- Surface: Grass
- Field size: Left Field: 316 ft (96 m); Left-Center Field: 340 ft (100 m); Center Field: 360 ft (110 m); Right-Center Field: 340 ft (100 m); Right Field: 316 ft (96 m)
- Public transit: Metro Ride

Construction
- Built: 1936
- Opened: 1936
- Expanded: 2013, 2015

Tenants
- Wausau Lumberjacks (NL) 1936–1942; 1946–1949; 1956–57; Wausau Timberjacks (WSL) 1950–1953; Wausau Mets (MWL) 1975–1978; Wausau Timbers (MWL) 1979–1990; Wausau Woodchucks (NWL) 1994–present Wausau Ignite (NWL) 2025-present

Athletic Park is a baseball stadium located in Wausau, Wisconsin. It is the home field of the Wausau Woodchucks baseball team and Wausau Ignite softball team, both of the summer collegiate Northwoods League. It hosted Wausau Minor League teams during 36 seasons between 1936-1990.

== History ==
Athletic Park was built in 1936. It sits in a residential area, just north of downtown Wausau, with a stone wall around the perimeter. The park was the home of the Wausau Timbers of the Class-A Midwest League until 1990. Additions during the era included a roof in 1950, concessions in 1977, and clubhouses in 1981. It held seating for 3,850 people.

After the 1990 season, the Wausau Timbers moved to Geneva, Illinois and became the Kane County Cougars. The ballpark has hosted the Wausau Woodchucks of the summer collegiate Northwoods League beginning in 1994.

Athletic Park was the home of Wausau East, Wausau West, and Wausau Newman high school baseball teams during the 1990s.

Between the 2013 and 2014 seasons, the ballpark underwent major renovations. The grandstand was demolished and replaced with a handicapped accessible one, including an elevator to the three levels. The new stadium opened May 30, 2014 for the Woodchucks home opener, which they lost, 6-4. The renovations were estimated at $2.7 million. More took place in Phase II of 2015-2016 construction, with further improvements totaling $6.5 million.

== Professional baseball ==
Professional baseball Wausau teams that have played at Athletic Park include: the Wausau Lumberjacks (1936-1942, 1946-1949, 1956–57), the Wausau Timberjacks (1950–1953), the Wausau Mets (1975-1978), and the Wausau Timbers (1979-1990). The teams were affiliated with the following major league franchises: the Cleveland Indians (1936 1937, 1942), the Philadelphia Phillies (1940–1941), the St. Louis Browns (1947–1949), the Detroit Tigers (1951–1953), the Cincinnati Reds (1956–1957), the New York Mets (1975-1978), Co-op (1979-1980), the Seattle Mariners (1981-1989), and the Baltimore Orioles (1990).

The Wausau teams were members of the following professional Minor Leagues: the Northern League (1936-1942, 1956–1957), the Wisconsin State League (1946-1953), and the Midwest League (1975-1990).

=== 1981 Midwest League Championship ===
The 1981 the Wausau Timbers finished 84-48 and defeated the Quad City Cubs for the Midwest League Championship at Athletic Park. The team was managed by Bill Plummer and had future MLB players Ivan Calderon, Darnell Coles, Edwin Nunez, Jim Presley, and Harold Reynolds on the roster.
