= DJ LeMahieu =

American baseball player (born 1988)

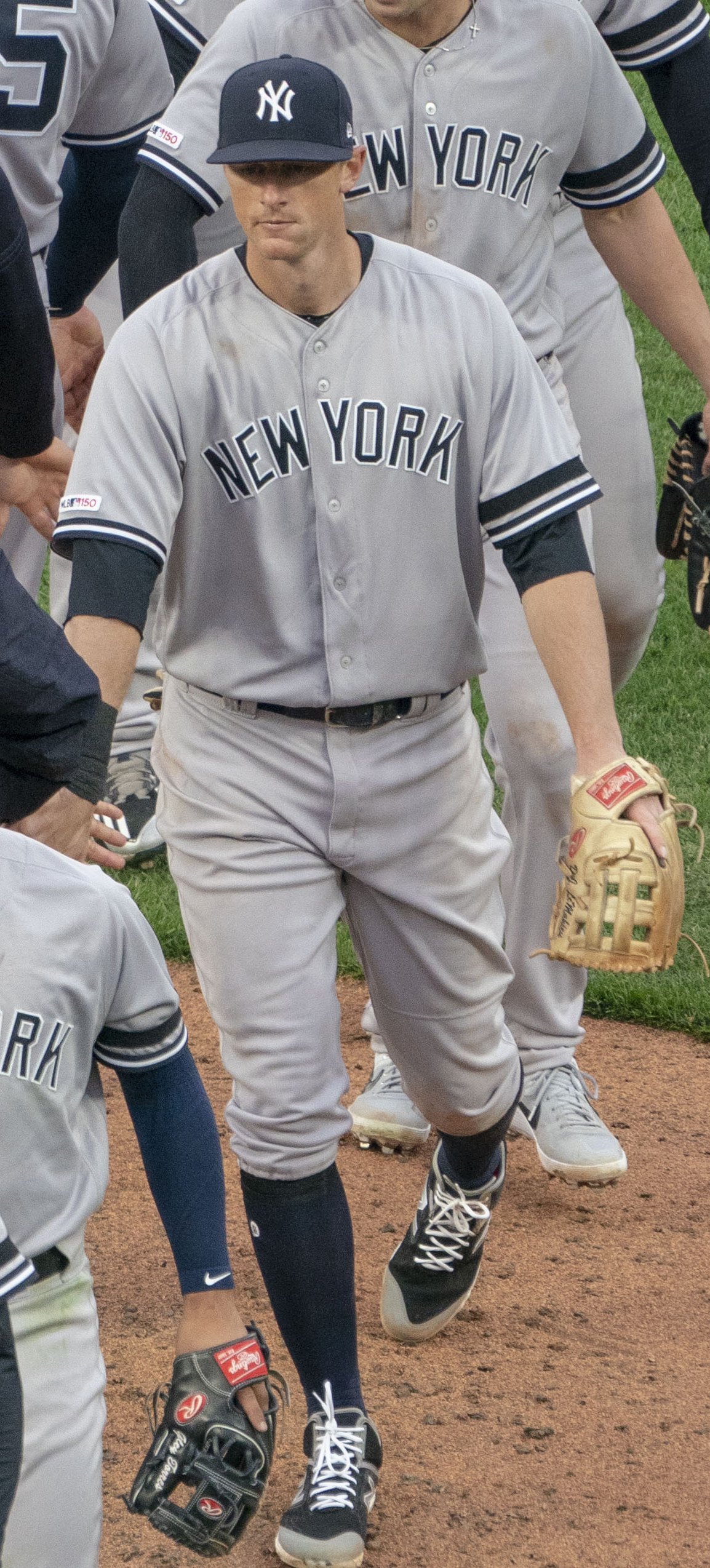
- LeMahieu with the New York Yankees in 2019

Royal Oak Leprechauns
- Infielder / Manager
- Born: July 13, 1988 (age 38); Visalia, California, U.S.
- Batted: Right Threw: Right

MLB debut
- May 30, 2011, for the Chicago Cubs

Last MLB appearance
- July 6, 2025, for the New York Yankees

MLB statistics
- Batting average: .289
- Hits: 1,772
- Home runs: 126
- Runs batted in: 663
- Stats at Baseball Reference

Teams
- Chicago Cubs (2011); Colorado Rockies (2012–2018); New York Yankees (2019–2025)

Career highlights and awards
- 3× All-Star (2015, 2017, 2019); 2× All-MLB First Team (2019, 2020); 4× Gold Glove Award (2014, 2017, 2018, 2022); 2× Silver Slugger Award (2019, 2020); 2× MLB batting champion (2016, 2020)

David John LeMahieu (/ləˈmeɪhjuː/; born July 13, 1988) is an American former professional baseball infielder who currently serves as the manager for the Royal Oak Leprechauns of the Northwoods League. He played in Major League Baseball (MLB) for the Chicago Cubs, Colorado Rockies, and New York Yankees from 2011 to 2025.

The Cubs selected LeMahieu in the second round of the 2009 MLB draft out of LSU, and he made his MLB debut for the Cubs in 2011 before being traded to the Rockies before the 2012 season. With Colorado, LeMahieu won Gold Glove Awards in 2014, 2017, and 2018, was named an All-Star in 2015 and 2017, and won the National League batting title in 2016. As a free agent after the 2018 season, he signed a two-year contract with the Yankees, where he had played as a third baseman, second baseman, and occasionally as a first baseman.

His versatility on defense and hitting ability earned LeMahieu the nickname "LeMachine" from Yankees teammate Gary Sánchez. He was also called "Big Fundy" due to his fundamentally sound techniques. With the Yankees, he was named a starter on the 2019 All-Star team, and won his first career Silver Slugger Award that year. LeMahieu won the American League batting title in 2020, becoming the first player in the modern era to win a batting title in each league.

== Early life and career ==
LeMahieu was born in Visalia, California. His family moved to Madison, Wisconsin, while he was in middle school, then to Michigan, where he attended Brother Rice High School in Bloomfield Township. He played as a shortstop and pitcher for the school's baseball team. In his senior year, as a leadoff hitter, he batted .574 with eight home runs, 16 doubles, seven triples, 70 runs scored, 32 runs batted in, and 39 stolen bases. He recorded two strikeouts in 92 at bats. His career average in high school was .459 with 201 hits. As a junior, he was an Aflac All-American. He was also a two-time Gatorade player of the year and Louisville Slugger Player of the Year for the State of Michigan.

After his senior year at Brother Rice, he was selected by the Detroit Tigers of Major League Baseball (MLB) in the 2007 MLB draft in the 41st round. He did not sign with Detroit so that he could attend college.

== College career ==
LeMahieu enrolled at Louisiana State University (LSU) to play college baseball for the LSU Tigers. As a freshman at LSU, for the 2008 season, he started in 67 of 68 games, hit .337 overall, and helped LSU reach the NCAA post-season play for the first time since 2005. In the post-season, he was selected to the All-Tournament team for the Baton Rouge regional after hitting .300 and scoring seven runs.

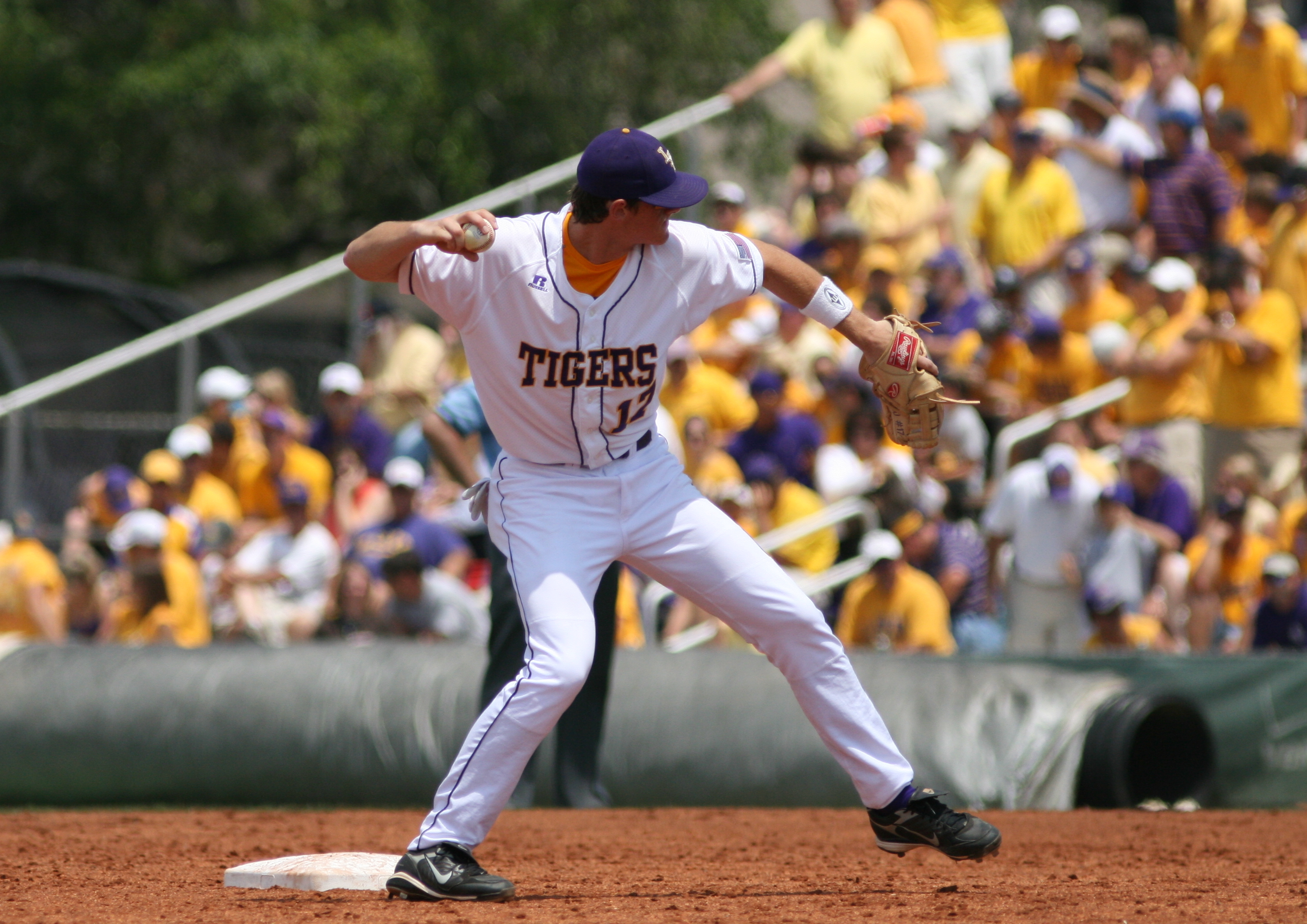
LeMahieu in 2008

In between his only two college baseball seasons, LeMahieu was part of the 2008 Harwich Mariners team in the Cape Cod Baseball League, where he was named a league all-star, earned the team's regular-season MVP award, and was named the No. 6 prospect in the Cape Cod League by Baseball America magazine. The Mariners won the League Championship Series for the first time in 21 years.

During his sophomore campaign, LeMahieu was selected as a pre-season All American by Collegiate Baseball. He opened the 2009 season with a 9-game hitting streak adding to his previous 16-game consecutive streak from the end of the 2008 campaign, to total hitting safely in 25 consecutive games. LeMahieu finished the season leading the team in batting average, .350 and total hits, 96. In Game 1 of the Championship Series, LeMahieu hit a home run in the seventh inning giving LSU the lead temporarily. Down to their final out in the ninth inning, LeMahieu hit a game tying double off the left field wall. He then led off the 11th inning with a walk, stole second base with two outs, and scored the game's winning run. LSU won the championship, and LeMahieu was selected to the 2009 College World Series All-Tournament team, hitting .444 in the series and leading all players with 12 hits.

== Professional career ==
=== Chicago Cubs ===
The Chicago Cubs selected LeMahieu in the second round, with the 79th overall selection, of the 2009 MLB draft. He played for the Peoria Chiefs of the Single–A Midwest League in 2009 after the draft. In 38 games, he hit .316 with 30 runs batted in. He spent the 2010 season with the Daytona Cubs of the High–A Florida State League, batting .314 with 73 runs batted in and 15 stolen bases in 135 games, going on to earn a Florida State League post-season All-Star selection. LeMahieu began the 2011 season with the Tennessee Smokies of the Double–A Southern League.

On May 30, 2011, the Cubs promoted LeMahieu to the major leagues when Jeff Baker was placed on the 15-day disabled list with a left groin strain. That day, LeMahieu made his major league debut pinch-hitting for the pitcher John Grabow, grounding into a double play. He did not stay in the game, a 12–7 loss to the Houston Astros. The Cubs demoted LeMahieu to the Iowa Cubs of the Triple–A Pacific Coast League (PCL) in June. He returned to the major leagues in September and would be honored as an MiLB.com Organization All-Star for the 2011 season.

=== Colorado Rockies ===
On December 8, 2011, the Cubs traded LeMahieu and Tyler Colvin to the Colorado Rockies for Casey Weathers and Ian Stewart. He began the 2012 season with the Colorado Springs Sky Sox of the PCL.

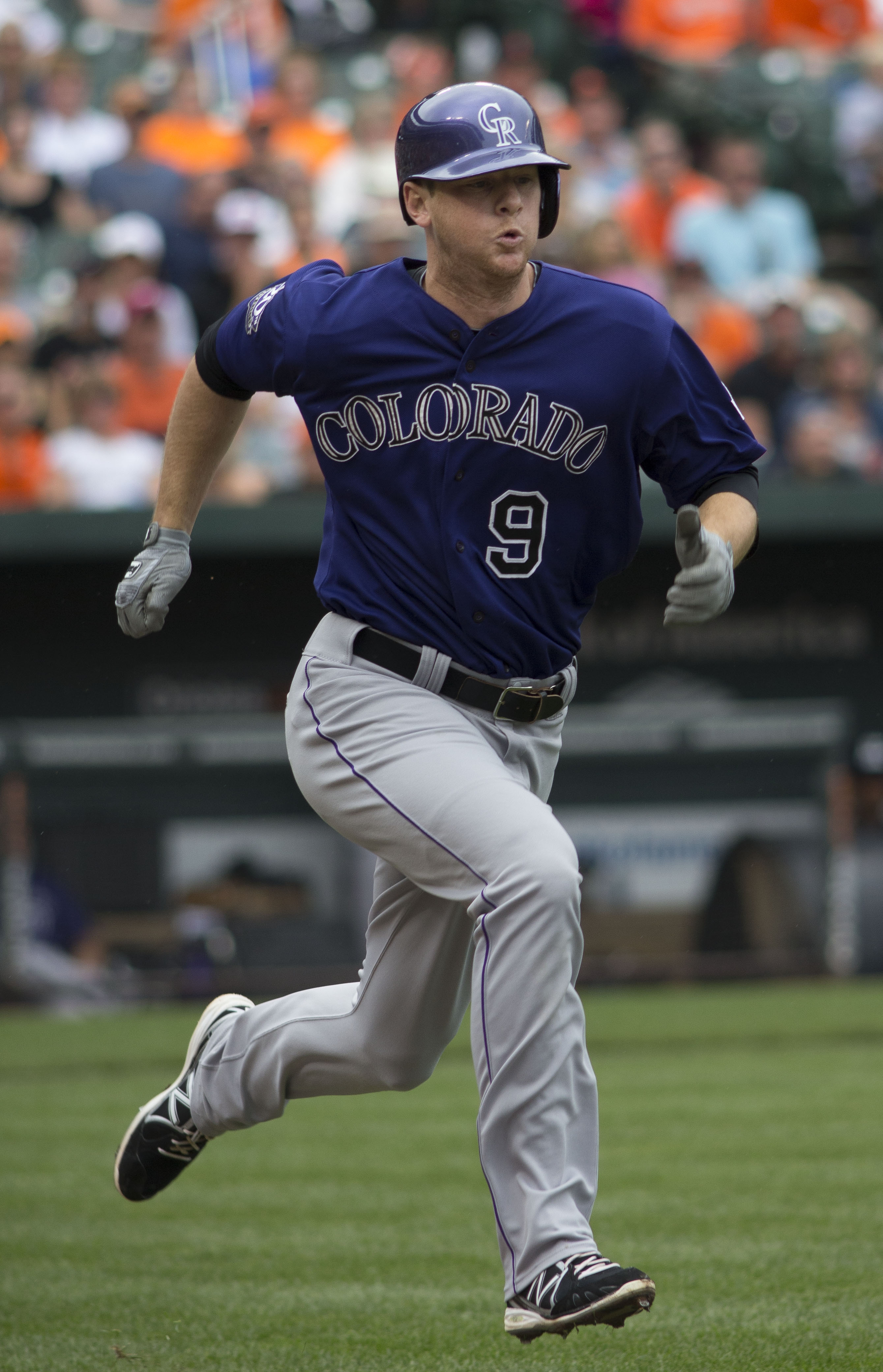
LeMahieu with the Rockies in 2013

On May 23, 2012, LeMahieu was called up to the major leagues to replace injured Jonathan Herrera as a utility infielder. He returned to Colorado Springs when Herrera was activated, and was recalled to the Rockies on July 17 when Chris Nelson was hospitalized. On August 14, he recorded a career-best four hits in a 9–6 Rockies win over the Milwaukee Brewers and in his first game against his former team, the Chicago Cubs, LeMahieu registered three hits in four at bats. Later in August, LeMahieu wrote his name into the record books, as he recorded 12 assists in a 9-inning victory against the Los Angeles Dodgers on the 28th. This mark tied a record held by several players.

In 2014, LeMahieu batted .267/.315/.348 with five home runs in 494 at bats. Defensively, he had an ultimate zone rating of 11.0, which was first in the National League (NL) and third in the majors. He won his first Gold Glove with 16 Defensive Runs Saved and led the majors with 99 double plays.

LeMahieu was the starting second baseman for the NL in the 2015 All-Star Game; this was LeMahieu's first All-Star selection. For the season, he batted .301 and led the majors in percentage of opposite field hits (39.0%), while seeing the highest percentage of fastballs of all MLB hitters (66.9%).

In 2016, LeMahieu won the NL batting title after batting .439 in August and .363 in September. His .348 season average led all of MLB. For the season, he had the highest batting average on balls in play (.388) of all major league players, and again led the majors in percentage of balls hit to the opposite field (37.9%).

LeMahieu was selected to the 2017 MLB All-Star Game as an injury replacement for Dee Gordon. He batted .310 and for the third consecutive year led the majors in percentage of balls hit to the opposite field (38.3%), while seeing the highest percentage of fastballs of all MLB hitters (67.0%). Also again in 2017, LeMahieu collected the NL Gold Glove for second basemen. Additionally, he won the Fielding Bible Award for all major league second basemen.

In the 2018 season, LeMahieu hit a career-high 15 home runs while batting .276/.321/.428. He was tied for seeing the highest percentage of fastballs of all MLB hitters (63.6%). In addition to an increase in power numbers, his defensive excellence continued. LeMahieu finished the 2018 season with a 19.5 SDI (SABR Defensive Index) highest of all NL players, and his 2.2 defensive WAR was eighth best among all of MLB. The .993 fielding percentage, .859 zone rating and 18 defensive runs saved were best for all NL second basemen. He earned both a third Gold Glove and a third Wilson Defensive Player of the Year Award.

=== New York Yankees ===
==== 2019 ====
On January 14, 2019, LeMahieu signed a two-year, $24 million deal with the New York Yankees. The Yankees anticipated using LeMahieu as a utility infielder. He put together a 14-game hitting streak from June 14 to 30 (including 6 consecutive multi-hit games from June 23–30). In the two-game London Series (which marked the halfway mark of the Yankees season) at the end of June, LeMahieu had seven hits in 12 at bats, three doubles and seven runs batted in, helping the Yankees to sweep the Red Sox in the series. This won LeMahieu his first career Player of the Week award, which he followed up by winning the June AL Player of the Month Award for the first time (batting .395/.434/.658 with six home runs, 29 RBIs, 26 runs scored, and 45 hits) and being elected as the starting second baseman for the All-Star game.

Due to injuries in the team, he spent time at first, second, and third base throughout the season. It was the first time he played in multiple positions since 2014, but did not cover shortstop that season. He was also the first Yankees player to ever make 25 starts in each of the three different infield positions. During the playoffs, he played exclusively at first base. In Game 6 of the 2019 ALCS, LeMahieu hit a game-tying two-run home-run in the ninth inning to tie the ballgame at 4–4, with the Yankees two outs from elimination. However, Jose Altuve would hit a walk-off home run in the bottom of the inning, eliminating the Yankees.

LeMahieu finished the 2019 season batting .327 with 26 home runs and 102 runs batted in during 145 games. He set new career highs in hits (197), doubles (33), home runs, runs batted in, runs scored (109), runs created (115), slugging percentage (.518), adjusted OPS+ (135), isolated power (.191), total bases (312), offensive WAR (5.2), fWAR (5.4), and bWAR (5.9). He had the lowest pull percentage of all major league batters (27.9%) and posted remarkably consistent stats all-round (his lowest monthly batting average was .282 in July, while his home/road and pre/post All-Star splits were .338/.318 and .336/.316 respectively). Additionally, besides ranking second in the American League in batting average behind Tim Anderson, he became the first Yankee to qualify for the batting title with a .300+ batting average since Canó in 2013, and posted the highest batting average for a Yankee player since Derek Jeter hit .334 in 2009. LeMahieu was awarded the Silver Slugger Award for the first time in his career, was named to the inaugural All-MLB First Team for second base, and finished fourth in the AL MVP voting behind Mike Trout, Alex Bregman, and Marcus Semien.

==== 2020 ====
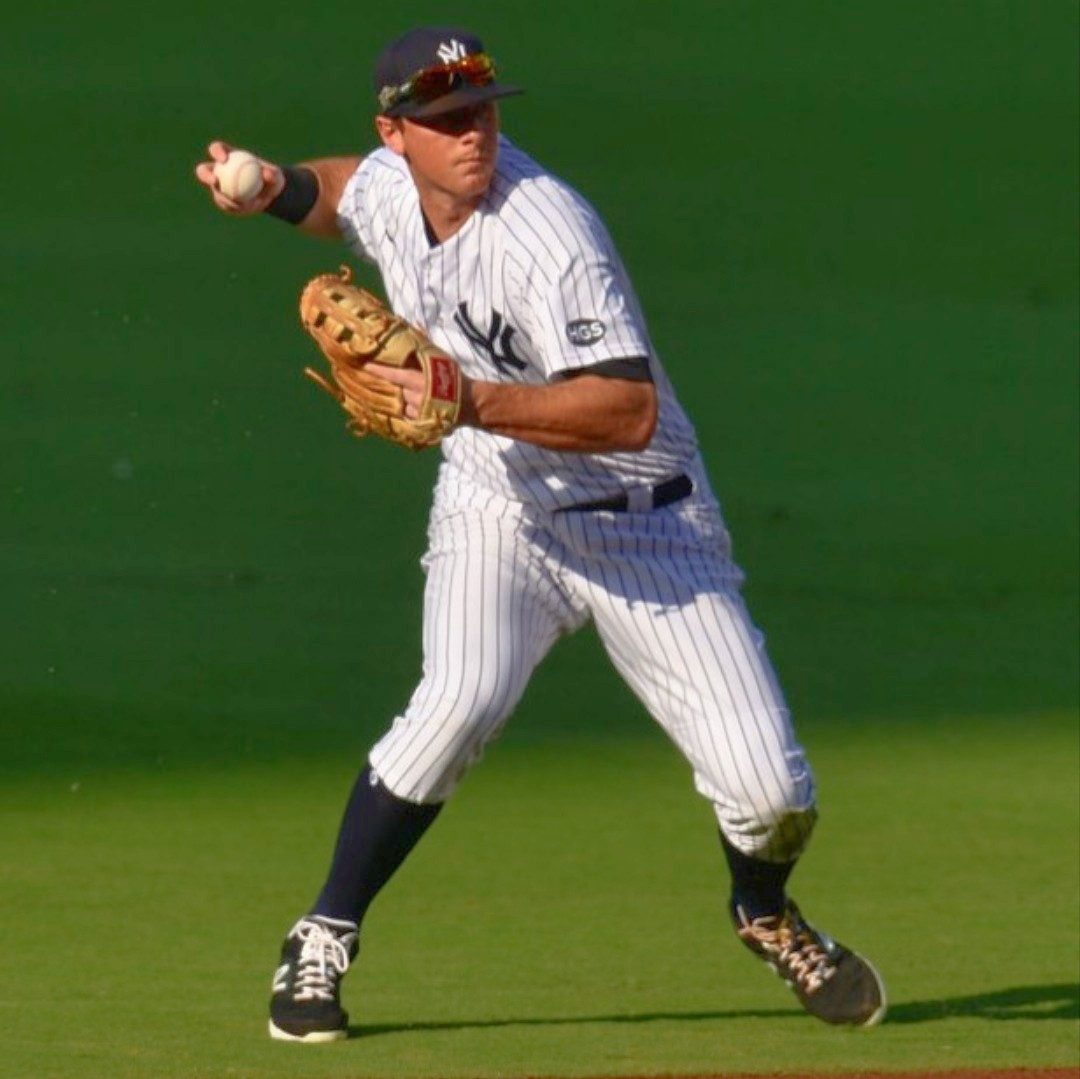
LeMahieu with the Yankees in 2020

LeMahieu did not appear in the Yankees' 2020 Opening Day starting lineup after recovering from COVID-19. After a four-hit game against the Atlanta Braves, he was batting .431 in 65 at-bats. However, he suffered a left thumb sprain against the Boston Red Sox on August 16 and was placed on the 10-day injured list. LeMahieu was activated from the injured list on August 29.

LeMahieu ended the season with a .364 batting average, which was the highest in the American League. He was the fourth Yankee to lead the majors in hitting, the ninth Yankee to win an AL batting title, and the first to do so since Bernie Williams in 1998. LeMahieu was also the second player ever to win a batting title in each league (LeMahieu led the NL in 2016 with a .348 average playing for the Colorado Rockies) following Ed Delahanty, who hit .410 for Philadelphia (NL) in 1899 and .376 for Washington (AL) in 1902. However, LeMahieu became the first player in MLB's "modern era" to win a batting title in both the American and National Leagues. With teammate Luke Voit leading MLB with home runs (with 22), the duo became the first pair of teammates to lead MLB in batting average and home runs since Hank Aaron (.355) and Eddie Mathews (46 HR) did it in 1959 with the Milwaukee Braves. Coincidentally, he also became the second Yankees player in a row, after Paul O'Neill in 1994, to win a batting title in a shortened season before entering contract negotiations. LeMahieu also led the AL in OBP (.421), OPS (1.011), adjusted OPS+ (177), offensive win percentage (.813), and bWAR for position players (2.8). He won his second consecutive Silver Slugger Award and finished third in AL MVP voting behind José Abreu and José Ramírez.

==== 2021 ====
On January 27, 2021, LeMahieu signed a six-year, $90 million deal in free agency to return to the Yankees. On May 7, 2021, during a game against the Washington Nationals, LeMahieu recorded his 300th career hit with the Yankees, doing so in his 225th game. This was the second fastest in team history behind Joe DiMaggio, who accomplished the feat in 200 games.

In 2021 he batted .268/.349/.362, and had the lowest pull percentage in the major leagues (at 24.8%), and the highest opposite field percentage (at 35.8%).

==== 2022 ====
In 2022, LeMahieu batted .261/.357/.377 in 467 at bats with 12 home runs and 46 RBIs. 60.1% of the pitches to him were fastballs, the highest percentage of those to any major leaguer. He swung at a lower percentage of pitches in the strike zone (54.7%) than any other major league batter. He became the first recipient of the American League Gold Glove Award for a utility player.

==== 2023 ====
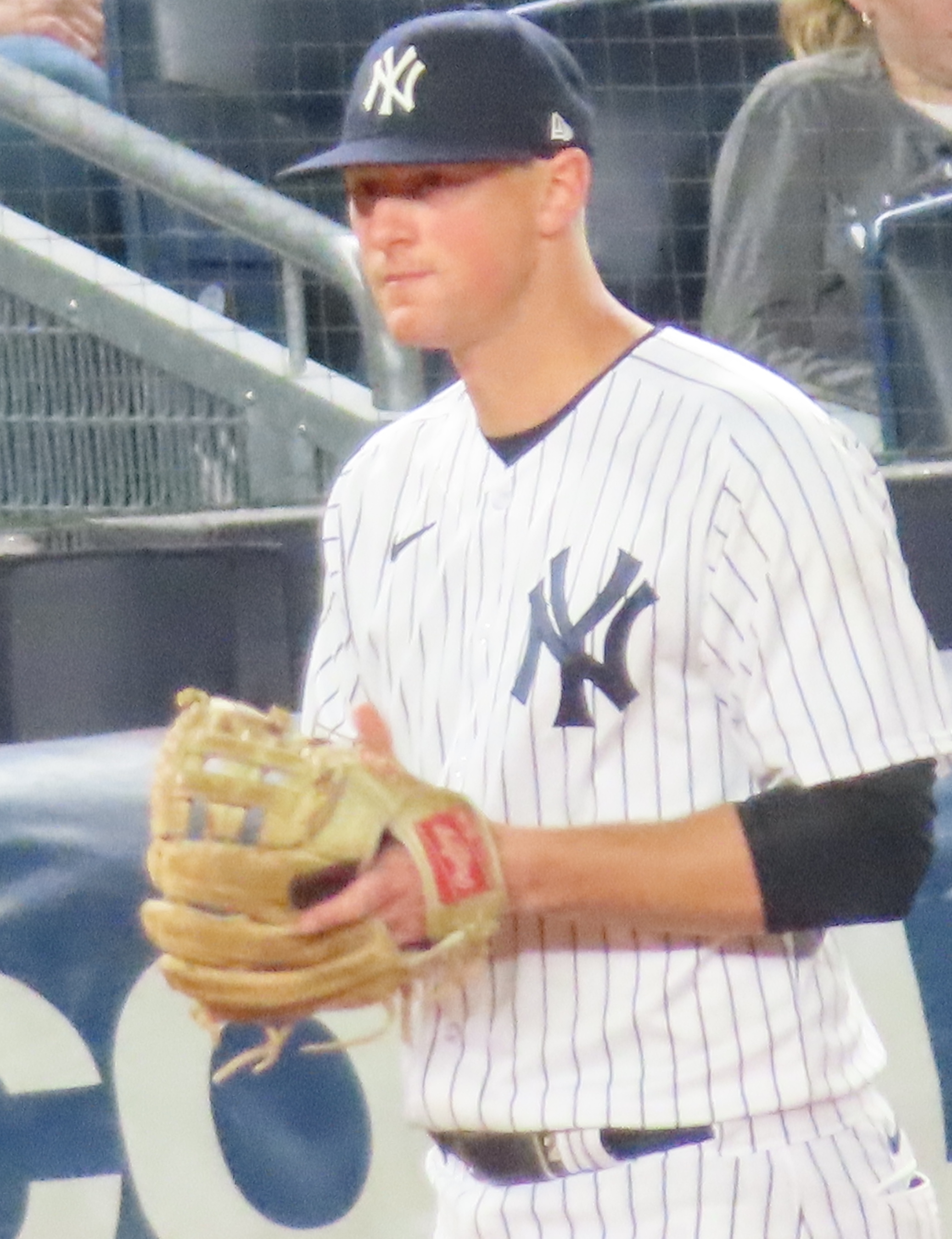
LeMahieu with the Yankees in 2023

LeMahieu played in a total of 136 games for the Yankees in 2023, batting .243/.327/.390 with 15 home runs and 44 RBI. He had experienced struggles while working under hitting coach Dillon Lawson, but saw a spike in production after Lawson was replaced midseason by Sean Casey.

==== 2024 ====
LeMahieu suffered a non-displaced fracture of his right foot prior to the 2024 season and began the year on the injured list. His rehabilitation was prolonged after he continued to experience soreness in the same foot. Playing in 67 games while batting .204/.269/.259 with just 2 home runs and 26 RBI. LeMahieu was activated from the injured list and returned to the Yankees' lineup on May 28, 2024.

==== 2025 ====
LeMahieu strained his left calf muscle prior to the 2025 season and began the year on the injured list. The injury put LeMahieu on the IL until May 13, 2025, when he made his season debut as a pinch hitter against the Seattle Mariners. In 45 appearances for the Yankees, he slashed .266/.338/.336 with two home runs and 12 RBI. Manager Aaron Boone announced on July 8 that Jazz Chisholm Jr. would resume playing as a second baseman and LeMahieu was being moved to a bench role. The next day, the Yankees designated LeMahieu for assignment, then released him a day later.

== Coaching career ==
On May 6, 2026, LeMahieu was announced as the manager for the Royal Oak Leprechauns of the Northwoods League.

== Batting profile ==
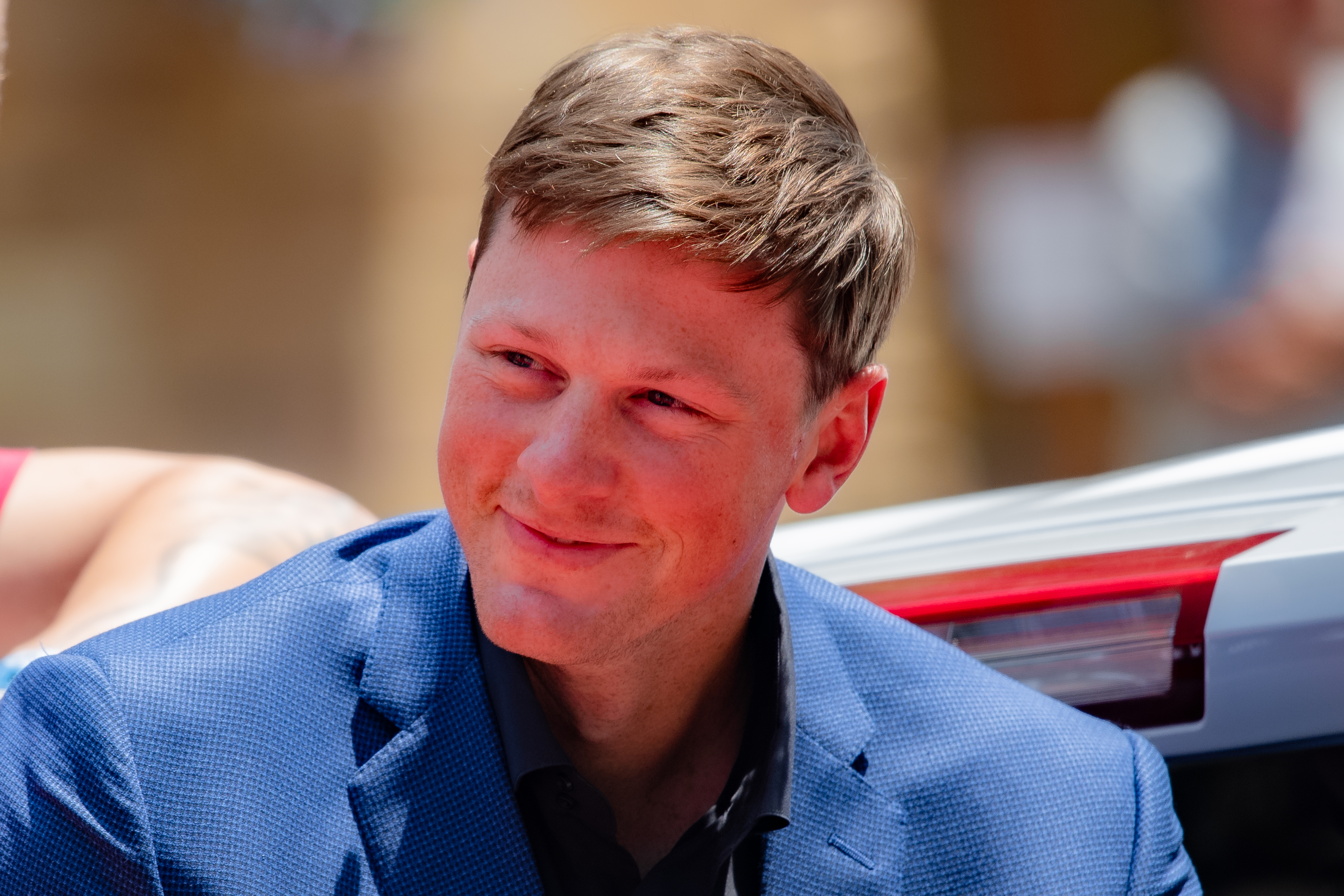
LeMahieu during the 2019 All-Star Red Carpet Parade in Cleveland, Ohio

Despite his 6'4", 215 pound frame that led many scouts to suggest that he had potential as a pure power hitter, LeMahieu became a powerful opposite field contact hitter. His tendency to not leg kick, and hit for contact with low launch angle (average of under 10 degrees) was compensated by his high exit velocity (91.7 mph average as of August 8, 2019), meaning he can still hit for extra bases while not getting long fly outs. Since the 2019 season, he more often hits opposite field home runs than pulled home runs.

== Personal life ==
LeMahieu and his wife, Jordan, were married in 2014. They reside in Birmingham, Michigan, during the offseason, and in Brooklyn during the season. Their first child, a daughter, was born on May 25, 2021.

LeMahieu is the President of the Royal Oak Leprechauns, a summer collegiate team in the Northwoods League.

== See also ==
- List of Major League Baseball annual assists leaders
- List of Major League Baseball batting champions
- List of Major League Baseball career assists leaders
- List of Major League Baseball career double plays leaders
- List of Major League Baseball career games played as a second baseman leaders
- List of Major League Baseball home run records
- New York Yankees award winners and league leaders
