= La Crosse Steam =

Softball team in Wisconsin, United States

Information
- League: Northwoods League
- Location: La Crosse, Wisconsin
- Ballpark: Copeland Park
- Founded: 2024
- Colors: Orange, red, dark blue, teal
- Ownership: Dan Kapanke and Ruth Kapanke
- President: Chris Goodell
- Website: northwoodsleague.com/la-crosse-steam

The La Crosse Steam are a fastpitch softball team that plays in the softball branch of the collegiate summer Northwoods League, also known as Northwoods League Softball (NWLS). The Steam play their home games at Copeland Park in La Crosse, Wisconsin. The team shares the ballpark with the NWL's La Crosse Loggers, with field modifications made for conversion between softball and baseball.

== History ==
=== Background ===
In May 2023, the Northwoods League announced that they were creating a summer collegiate softball league to begin play in 2024. Explaining the rationale, co-founder Kathy Radatz said “We have seen tremendous growth in interest in women’s softball in recent years, and we are excited to be able to provide a platform for female athletes to continue to hone their skills and compete at a high level during the summer months.”

In fall 2023, La Crosse was announced as the first host site for an NWLS team, and the team solicited suggestions for the team nickname. The names were narrowed down to five: Legacy, Velocity, Steam, Cruisers, and Maple Leafs. After a fan vote, Steam was chosen, as a reference to the history of La Crosse and its connection to steamboats. Uniform colors include orange and light blue.

=== 2024 season ===
La Crosse joined with teams in Madison, Wisconsin; Mankato, Minnesota; and Minot, North Dakota in the inaugural season of the upstart softball league. The Steam played against the Madison Night Mares in the first ever NWLS game, hosted at Copeland Park, taking a 2–1 win. La Crosse finished their inaugural season with a 17–25 record, third place among the four teams.

Pitcher Mackenzie Willis was named NWLS Pitcher of the Year after an outstanding season. In 118.2 innings pitched, she struck out 129 batters, maintaining a 2.10 ERA. She held an 11-5 record in 18 starts and collected three saves. As of the end of the 2026 season, she is the all-time single season record holder for complete games (11), innings pitched (118.2), strikeouts (129), and saves (in a tie with 3). All of these records are from the 2024 season. She also collected the very first strikeout and the first win in NWLS history.

=== 2025 season ===
In 2025, NWLS expanded to five teams with the addition of Wausau, Wisconsin. The Steam finished the season with a record of 16–26, better only than the Wausau Ignite and falling short of the NWLS's first ever playoff series.

=== 2026 season ===
In 2026, the Steam finished the season with a 20-22 record, in fourth place among th six NWLS teams. They did not qualify for the playoffs. Pitcher Preslynn Baker had an impressive season for the Steam, leading NWLS in both strikeouts (85) and saves (3). Her 3 saves tied her with former Steam pitcher Mackenzie Willis for the NWLS single-season record. Catcher Avary Makarewicz led the league in walks with 35, an all-time NWLS record as of the end of the 2026 season.

== Player highlights ==
=== Full-season All-Stars ===
The following players have been selected as NWLS Post-Season All Stars, honoring their performance over the course of the full softball season.

Year	Player	Pos.	College
2024	Avary Makarewicz	C	Tennessee-Martin
2024	Mackenzie Willis	P	Belmont
2025	Avary Makarewicz	C	Tennessee-Martin
2026	Trinity Gregg	OF	Jamestown
2026	Preslynn Baker	P	John Melvin College

=== Awards ===
NWLS Pitcher of the Year - Mackenzie Willis (2024)

=== NWLS single-season records ===
The following all-time NWLS single season records are held by Steam players as of the end of the 2026 season:

	Stat	Player	#	Season
Pitching	Strikeouts	Mackenzie Willis	129	2024
Pitching	Innings pitched	Mackenzie Willis	118.2	2024
Pitching	Complete games	Mackenzie Willis	11	2024
Pitching	Saves	Mackenzie Willis	3 (tie)	2024
Pitching	Saves	Preslynn Baker	3 (tie)	2026
Hitting	Walks	Avary Makarewicz	35	2026

Hitting rate stat qualifiers require minimum of 2.00 plate appearances per team game. Pitching rate stat qualifiers require minimum of 1.00 innings pitched per team game. Cumulative stats include all NWLS players in a given season.
