= Grand Forks Spitfires =

Softball team in North Dakota, United States

Information
- League: Northwoods League
- Location: Grand Forks, North Dakota
- Ballpark: Albrecht Field
- Founded: 2026
- Colors: Blue, orange, green, grey
- Ownership: John Bollinger & Marcie Bollinger, Monica & Dylan Hocking, Ryan Voz, Marc Jerzak, Dave & Alexa Albrecht, Tom & Martie Wesley, Mike Opp
- General manager: Roberto Lemus
- Website: northwoodsleague.com/grand-forks-spitfires/

The Grand Forks Spitfires are a fastpitch softball team that plays in the softball branch of the collegiate summer Northwoods League, also known as Northwoods League Softball (NWLS). The Spitfires play their home games at Albrecht Field in Grand Forks, North Dakota, sharing the stadium with the University of North Dakota Fighting Hawks softball team.

== History ==
In May 2023, the Northwoods League announced that they were creating a summer collegiate softball league to begin play in 2024. Explaining the rationale, co-founder Kathy Radatz said “We have seen tremendous growth in interest in women’s softball in recent years, and we are excited to be able to provide a platform for female athletes to continue to hone their skills and compete at a high level during the summer months.”

In 2024, the NWLS launched with teams in Madison, Wisconsin; La Crosse, Wisconsin; Mankato, Minnesota; and Minot, North Dakota. In 2025, the Wausau Ignite were added, bringing the circuit to five teams and introducing a playoff series.

In 2025, the NWLS announced that a sixth team would be added for the 2026 season, playing their home games at Albrecht Field in Grand Forks. They were the first NWLS team to not share a stadium with a Northwoods baseball team and the first NWLS team to play in a non-NWL baseball market. The Grand Forks Channel Cats had previously played in the NWL from 1998-2000.

=== 2026 season ===
In 2026, the Spitfires had their inaugural season. They finished with a 20-20 record, good for third place in NWLS and nearly qualifying them for the playoffs.

Four Spitfires were named to the NWLS inaugural All-Star game, with standout two-way player Mattison Kwarta winning the Home Run Derby. At season end, Kwarta led the league in OBP (.556) among qualified hitters, setting an all-time NWLS record in the process. Outfielder Alex Graham hit 17 doubles, leading the league and setting an all-time NWLS record.

== Player highlights ==
=== Full-season All-Stars ===
The following players have been selected as NWLS Post-Season All Stars, honoring their performance over the course of the full softball season.

Year	Player	Pos.	College
2026	Ally Hetzel	C	Washington
2026	Shannon Cunningham	1B	San Diego State
2026	Mattison Kwarta	P	San Diego State
2026	Madison Wihlm	P	North Dakota State

=== NWLS single-season records ===
The following all-time NWLS single season records are held by Spitfires as of the end of the 2026 season:

Stat	Player	#	Season
On-base percentage	Mattison Kwarta	.556	2026
Doubles	Alex Graham	17	2026

Hitting rate stat qualifiers require minimum of 2.00 plate appearances per team game. Cumulative stats include all NWLS players in a given season.

== Brand ==
In November 2025, the team announced the Spitfires identity and unveiled their branding. Spitfires was chosen from six nickname finalists, with the others being Flying Aces, Spudniks, Sweet Beets, Voodoo, and Wingnuts. Team colors (blue, orange, green, and grey) and aviation-themed logos were revealed, drawing reference from the Supermarine Spitfire aircraft.
