= Professional Softball League =

Professional women's softball league

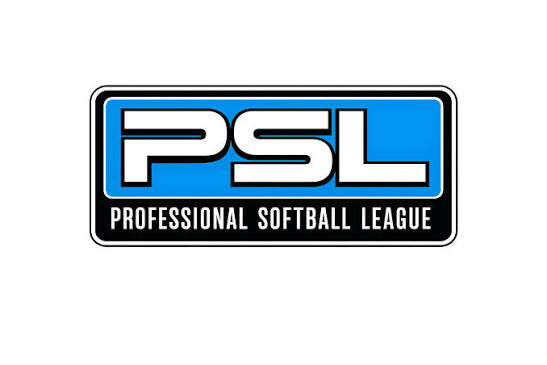
- Sport: Fastpitch softball
- Founded: December 1, 2025; 11 months ago
- First season: 2026
- No. of teams: 7
- Country: United States
- Headquarters: 2722 Manatee Avenue West Suite 2 Bradenton, Florida 34205
- Streaming partner: AWSN
- Website: https://www.professionalsoftballleague.com

Professional Softball League (PSL) is a professional women's fastpitch softball league in the United States. The new league was announced in late 2025 and began its first season in June 2026.

== History ==
Following the collapse of the Women's Professional Fastpitch in 2024, women's professional softball in the United States was fragmented. Plans were put together to form a new league for 2026, made up of the three teams from Fastpitch United and four other independent teams. The 2026 PSL season involves five established teams: Florida Vibe, Atlanta Smoke, Kansas City Diamonds, Florida Breeze, and New York Rise; along with exhibition teams Chattanooga Chill, Birmingham Iron, and St. Louis Gateway Gold. The exhibition teams, along with Florida Heat, are expected to be joining the league in 2027. Many games will stream on the All Women’s Sports Network (AWSN) when the season kicks off on June 12.

== Teams ==
2026 Professional Softball League teams
Team	Location	Venue	Joined
Atlanta Smoke	Atlanta, GA	Hermance Stadium	2026
KC Diamonds	Kansas City, Kansas	Legends Field	2026
New York Rise	Garden City, NY	Bill Edwards Stadium	2026
Florida Breeze	Bradenton, Florida	Palma Sola Park	2026
Florida Vibe	Pensacola, Florida	Blue Wahoos Stadium	2026

== Development League ==
The professional sports league also has a minor league called Professional Softball League Development (PSLD). This league enables player development, gives opportunities to play PSL teams, and for the opportunity for call-ups, similar to MLB.

== See also ==
- List of organized baseball leagues
  - Athletes Unlimited Softball League
  - Women's Pro Baseball League
- Women in baseball
- Women's sports in the United States
