= Austin Vetter =

American prelate of the Catholic Church (born 1967)

His Excellency, The Most Reverend Austin Vetter
- Bishop of Helena
- Archdiocese: Portland
- Diocese: Helena
- Appointed: October 8, 2019
- Installed: November 20, 2019
- Predecessor: George Leo Thomas

Orders
- Ordination: June 29, 1993 by John Francis Kinney
- Consecration: November 20, 2019 by Alexander King Sample, James F. Checchio, and David Kagan

Personal details
- Born: September 13, 1967 (age 58) Linton, North Dakota
- Education: North Dakota State University; Cardinal Muench Seminary; Pontifical University of St. Thomas Aquinas
- Motto: Fiat (Let it be done)

Styles of Austin Anthony Vetter
- Reference style: His Excellency; The Most Reverend
- Spoken style: Your Excellency
- Religious style: Bishop

Austin Anthony Vetter (born September 13, 1967) is an American prelate of the Roman Catholic Church who has been serving as bishop of the Diocese of Helena in Montana since 2019.

== Biography ==
=== Early life ===
Austin Vetter was born on September 13, 1967, in Linton, North Dakota. He attended primary and secondary schools in the Linton Public School System. Vetter entered North Dakota State University in Fargo, North Dakota, in 1985.

After deciding to become a priest, Vetter left North Dakota State in 1986 to enroll at Cardinal Muench Seminary in Fargo, North Dakota. In 1989, he went to Rome to continue his formation at the Pontifical North American College. He received a Bachelor of Sacred Theology degree from the Pontifical University of St. Thomas Aquinas in 1992.

=== Priesthood ===
On June 29, 1993, Vetter was ordained to the priesthood for the Diocese of Bismarck at the Cathedral of the Holy Spirit in Bismarck, North Dakota, by Bishop John Kinney. The diocese assigned Vetter to pastoral positions at the following parishes in North Dakota:

- Parochial vicar at Cathedral of the Holy Spirit (1993 to 1996). He also served as a religion instructor at St. Mary's Central High School in Bismarck from 1994 to 1999.
- Parochial vicar and later pastor of St. Martin's in Center (1996 to 1999)

In 1999, Vetter was appointed as episcopal vicar for the permanent diaconate as well as pastor of St. Patrick's Parish in Dickinson, North Dakota. He left St. Patrick's in 2008 after being named pastor of St. Leo the Great Parish in Minot, North Dakota, and director of continuing education for clergy.

Vetter returned to the North American College in July 2012 after its oversight board appointed him as director of spiritual formation. He would hold this position for the next six years. In 2018, Bishop David D. Kagan named him rector of the Cathedral of the Holy Spirit.

=== Bishop of Helena ===
Pope Francis appointed Vetter as the eleventh bishop of Helena on October 8, 2019. Vetter was consecrated by Archbishop Alexander Sample on November 20, 2019, at Saint Helena Cathedral, with Bishops James F. Checchio and David Kagan serving as co-consecrators.

In February 2022, in response to Pope Francis motu proprio Traditionis custodes Vetter announced the suppression of all Tridentine Masses within the diocese, despite originally allowing the continuation of them, months before.

=== Interim Co-President of Carroll College ===
On June 25, 2025, Carroll College announced that Vetter and Dr. Jennifer Glowienka, senior vice president for academic affairs, would assume the roles of interim co-presidents for the 2025-26 academic year.

== See also ==
- Catholic Church hierarchy
- Catholic Church in the United States
- Historical list of the Catholic bishops of the United States
- List of Catholic bishops of the United States
- Lists of patriarchs, archbishops, and bishops

Catholic Church titles
Preceded by George Leo Thomas	Bishop of Helena; 2019-present	Succeeded by Incumbent
