= KLTQ =

KLTQ may refer to:

- KLTQ (FM), a radio station (90.9 FM) licensed to serve Thatcher, Arizona, United States
- KLTQ (Beulah), a defunct radio station (97.9 FM) formerly licensed to serve Beulah, North Dakota, United States
- KQLZ (FM), a radio station (95.7 FM) licensed to serve New England, North Dakota, which held the call sign KLTQ from 2012 to 2013
- KOOO, a radio station (101.9 FM) licensed to serve La Vista, Nebraska, United States, which held the call sign KLTQ from 2002 to 2007
