= KQLZ =

KQLZ may refer to:

- KQLZ (FM), a radio station (95.7 FM) licensed to serve New England, North Dakota, United States
- KLTQ (Beulah), a defunct radio station (97.9 FM) formerly licensed to serve Beulah, North Dakota, which held the call sign KQLZ from 2012 to 2013
- KPDA (FM), a radio station (99.1 FM) licensed to serve Mountain Home, Idaho, United States, which held the call sign KQLZ from 2008 to 2011
- KKLQ (FM), a radio station (100.3 FM) licensed to serve Los Angeles, California, United States, which held the call sign KQLZ from 1989 to 1993
