= Solon Mills, Illinois =

- Census-designated place
- Location within Illinois Location within the United States
- Coordinates: 42°26′32″N 88°16′35″W
- Country: United States
- State: Illinois
- County: McHenry
- Township: Richmond

Area
  - Total: 0.19 sq mi (0.50 km^{2})
  - Land: 0.19 sq mi (0.50 km^{2})
  - Water: 0 sq mi (0.00 km^{2})
- Elevation: 778 ft (237 m)

Population (2020)
  - Total: 133
  - Density: 682.5/sq mi (263.51/km^{2})
- Time zone: UTC-6 (Central (CST))
  - Summer (DST): UTC-5 (CDT)
- ZIP code: 60071, 60080 (former)
- Area codes: 815 & 779
- GNIS feature ID: 2806560

Solon Mills is an unincorporated community and census-designated place in McHenry County, Illinois, United States. Solon Mills is located on U.S. Route 12, 2 miles (3.2 km) southwest of Spring Grove. Solon Mills is part of ZIP code 60071; it once had its own post office with ZIP code 60080 before it closed on September 28, 2002. It was named a CDP before the 2020 census, at which time it had a population of 133.

== Demographics ==
Historical population
| Census | Pop. | Note | %± |
|---|---|---|---|
| 2020 | 133 | | — |
U.S. Decennial Census; 2020

Solon Mills first appeared as a census designated place in the 2020 U.S. census.

=== 2020 census ===
Solon Mills CDP, Illinois – Racial and ethnic composition Note: the US Census treats Hispanic/Latino as an ethnic category. This table excludes Latinos from the racial categories and assigns them to a separate category. Hispanics/Latinos may be of any race.
| Race / Ethnicity (NH = Non-Hispanic) | Pop 2020 | % 2020 |
|---|---|---|
| White alone (NH) | 111 | 83.46% |
| Black or African American alone (NH) | 0 | 0.00% |
| Native American or Alaska Native alone (NH) | 1 | 0.75% |
| Asian alone (NH) | 0 | 0.00% |
| Native Hawaiian or Pacific Islander alone (NH) | 0 | 0.00% |
| Other race alone (NH) | 0 | 0.00% |
| Mixed race or Multiracial (NH) | 10 | 7.52% |
| Hispanic or Latino (any race) | 11 | 8.27% |
| Total | 133 | 100.00% |
