= Michelle Duppong =

American Catholic Laywoman

Servant of God Michelle Christine Duppong
- Born: January 25, 1984; Wheat Ridge, Colorado, US
- Hometown: Haymarsh, North Dakota
- Died: December 25, 2015 (aged 31); Haymarsh, North Dakota, US

Michelle Christine Duppong (January 25, 1984 – December 25, 2015) was an American Catholic laywoman who served as the Director of Adult Faith Formation for the Diocese of Bismarck before dying of cancer at the age of 31. Previously, she worked as a campus minister with Fellowship of Catholic University Students (FOCUS), a Catholic organization for college students, at various universities in the American Midwest. On November 1, 2022, the Diocese of Bismarck began promoting the cause of her beatification, granting her the title Servant of God.

== Early life and education ==
Michelle Christine Duppong was born in Wheat Ridge, Colorado to a Catholic family on January 25, 1984, later moving to Haymarsh, North Dakota at the age of 1. After graduating high school, Duppong enrolled in North Dakota State University, where she earned a degree in horticulture in 2006.

== Missionary work with FOCUS ==
At North Dakota State, she first encountered the Catholic campus ministry FOCUS, which led her working with the ministry post-graduation for six years, including at the University of Mary. She was known for being a mentor towards students and showing kindness to many around her, even helping influence men to join the priesthood and women to become religious sisters. Over her time in the ministry, she worked with hundreds of students at various universities.

After working with FOCUS, Michelle Duppong became the Director of Adult Faith Formation for the Diocese of Bismarck, where she coordinated various events in the diocese, including conferences and outreach events.

In 2014, Duppong was diagnosed with stage four cancer, in what was initially thought were ovarian cysts. Throughout her time with cancer, she was known for being "docile to the Will of God" and being a positive presence in the hospital she was in. She died on Christmas Day, which she had reportedly predicted.

A documentary about her life, Radiating Joy: The Michelle Duppong Story, was released in 2024.

== Beatification process ==
On June 16, 2022, it was announced that a formal inquiry would be started on Duppong's life. On All Saints Day of that year, her cause for beatification was opened based on her reported holiness as well as miracles being granted through her intercession, including the healing of a woman with the same type of cancer as Duppong had. She was declared Servant of God by Bishop David Kagan in November 2022 at the Cathedral of the Holy Spirit in Bismarck.
