= Spring Grove, Illinois =

- Village
- Village of Spring Grove
- Seal

- Location of Spring Grove in McHenry County, Illinois.
- Coordinates: 42°27′08″N 88°14′12″W
- Country: United States
- State: Illinois
- County: McHenry
- Townships: Richmond, Burton
- Incorporated: October 6, 1902

Area
  - Total: 9.08 sq mi (23.52 km^{2})
  - Land: 9.05 sq mi (23.44 km^{2})
  - Water: 0.031 sq mi (0.08 km^{2})
- Elevation: 797 ft (243 m)

Population (2020)
  - Total: 5,487
  - Density: 606.2/sq mi (234.07/km^{2})
- Time zone: UTC-6 (CST)
  - Summer (DST): UTC-5 (CDT)
- ZIP code: 60081
- Area code: 815
- FIPS code: 17-72052
- GNIS feature ID: 2399876
- Website: www.springgrovevillage.com

Spring Grove is a village in McHenry County, Illinois, United States. It is a commuter village within the Chicago metropolitan area. Per the 2020 census, the population was 5,487.

== History ==
The first tower grain silo in the USA was built in Spring Grove in 1873.

== Geography ==
Spring Grove is located at According to the 2010 census, Spring Grove has a total area of 8.711 square miles (22.56 km^{2}), of which 8.68 square miles (22.48 km^{2}) (or 99.64%) is land and 0.031 square miles (0.08 km^{2}) (or 0.36%) is water.

== Demographics ==
Historical population
Census	Pop.	Note	%±
1910	203		—
1920	363		78.8%
1930	184		−49.3%
1940	209		13.6%
1950	269		28.7%
1960	301		11.9%
1970	348		15.6%
1980	571		64.1%
1990	1,066		86.7%
2000	3,880		264.0%
2010	5,778		48.9%
2020	5,487		−5.0%
U.S. Decennial Census; 2010 2020

=== Racial and ethnic composition ===
Spring Grove village, Illinois – Racial and ethnic composition Note: the US Census treats Hispanic/Latino as an ethnic category. This table excludes Latinos from the racial categories and assigns them to a separate category. Hispanics/Latinos may be of any race.
Race / Ethnicity (NH = Non-Hispanic)	Pop 2000	Pop 2010	Pop 2020	% 2000	% 2010	% 2020
White alone (NH)	3,278	5,462	4,955	96.08%	94.53%	90.30%
Black or African American alone (NH)	5	32	22	0.13%	0.55%	0.40%
Native American or Alaska Native alone (NH)	3	8	4	0.08%	0.14%	0.07%
Asian alone (NH)	35	45	47	0.90%	0.78%	0.86%
Pacific Islander alone (NH)	4	3	0	0.10%	0.05%	0.00%
Other race alone (NH)	1	0	7	0.03%	0.00%	0.13%
Mixed race or Multiracial (NH)	35	43	174	0.90%	0.74%	3.17%
Hispanic or Latino (any race)	69	185	278	1.78%	3.20%	5.07%
Total	3,880	5,778	5,487	100.00%	100.00%	100.00%

=== 2020 census ===
As of the 2020 census, Spring Grove had a population of 5,487. The median age was 45.5 years. 22.3% of residents were under the age of 18 and 16.5% of residents were 65 years of age or older. For every 100 females there were 103.1 males, and for every 100 females age 18 and over there were 101.4 males age 18 and over.

29.6% of residents lived in urban areas, while 70.4% lived in rural areas.

There were 1,877 households in Spring Grove, of which 33.7% had children under the age of 18 living in them. Of all households, 76.6% were married-couple households, 9.0% were households with a male householder and no spouse or partner present, and 9.9% were households with a female householder and no spouse or partner present. About 10.3% of all households were made up of individuals and 5.3% had someone living alone who was 65 years of age or older.

There were 1,935 housing units, of which 3.0% were vacant. The homeowner vacancy rate was 1.2% and the rental vacancy rate was 8.7%.

=== 2000 census ===
As of the census of 2000, there were 3,880 people, 1,166 households, and 1,045 families residing in the village. The population density was 624.7 inhabitants per square mile (241.2/km^{2}). There were 1,205 housing units at an average density of 194.0 per square mile (74.9/km^{2}). The racial makeup of the village was 97.37% White, 0.13% African American, 0.15% Native American, 0.90% Asian, 0.10% Pacific Islander, 0.36% from other races, and 0.98% from two or more races. Hispanic or Latino of any race were 1.78% of the population.

There were 1,166 households, out of which 54.5% had children under the age of 18 living with them, 84.5% were married couples living together, 3.7% had a female householder with no husband present, and 10.3% were non-families. 7.5% of all households were made up of individuals, and 2.2% had someone living alone who was 65 years of age or older. The average household size was 3.33 and the average family size was 3.52.

In the village, the population was spread out, with 35.3% under the age of 18, 4.9% from 18 to 24, 33.7% from 25 to 44, 20.8% from 45 to 64, and 5.3% who were 65 years of age or older. The median age was 34 years. For every 100 females, there were 100.8 males. For every 100 females age 18 and over, there were 96.9 males.

The median income for a household in the village was $80,542, and the median income for a family was $82,996. Males had a median income of $60,933 versus $33,882 for females. The per capita income for the village was $25,506. About 1.7% of families and 2.4% of the population were below the poverty line, including 2.3% of those under age 18 and none of those age 65 or over.

== Notable people ==
- Brooke Barrettsmith, contestant on the reality television show American Idol in 2006
- Nick Etten, first baseman for various teams
- David Kagan, bishop of the Roman Catholic Diocese of Bismarck, North Dakota
- Bobby Klaus, infielder for various teams
- Jen Lada, sportscaster for ESPN and Emmy winner
