= Dave Weiler =

American politician

Member of the North Dakota House of Representatives from the 30th district
- In office December 1, 2000 – December 1, 2012
- Preceded by: Dale Henegar
- Succeeded by: Diane Larson

Personal details
- Born: April 1, 1965 (age 61) Dickinson, North Dakota
- Party: Republican

Dave Weiler (born April 1, 1965) is an American politician who serve in the North Dakota House of Representatives from the 30th district from 2000 to 2012.
