= Jen Lada =

American sportscaster (born 1981)

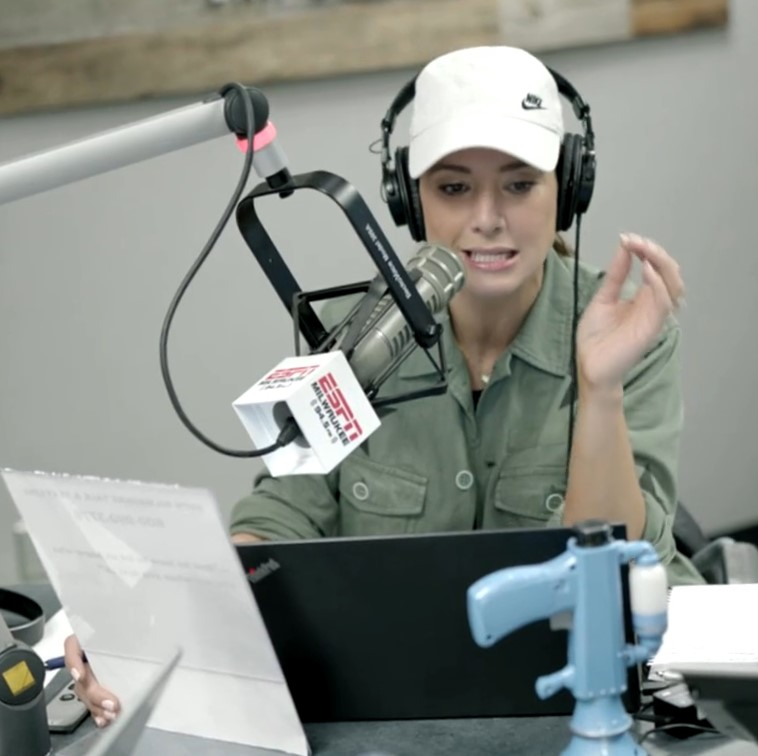
- Lada broadcasting in 2021
- Born: Jennifer Lada; January 14, 1981 (age 45); Spring Grove, Illinois, U.S.
- Education: Marquette University
- Occupations: Sports reporter and anchor
- Years active: 2003–present
- Spouse: Dario Melendez (m. 2017)
- Children: 3

Jennifer Lada (born January 14, 1981) is an American sportscaster for ESPN. She previously worked for networks in Milwaukee and Chicago.

== Early life and education ==
Lada grew up in Spring Grove, Illinois, between Chicago and Milwaukee. She ran track at Marian Central Catholic High School. She captained the cheerleading team while studying communication at Marquette University in Wisconsin, where she graduated in 2002.

== Career ==
Lada began her broadcasting career after college as a sports reporter and anchor for the NBC affiliate station WREX in Rockford, Illinois. A restaurant service job supplemented her income in Rockford. She moved to the Fox affiliate WITI in Milwaukee in 2006. She eventually felt "limited" in her role as a weekend sports anchor for WITI, and in early 2013 she moved to a larger media market by joining the NBC affiliate Comcast SportsNet Chicago (CSN). At first hired to cover NHL hockey, she worked as a reporter and an anchor for CSN and sometimes appeared on its Kap & Haugh radio show.

ESPN hired Lada in July 2015, originally to contribute to Colin Cowherd's ESPN Radio show, but Cowherd left the network before Lada would have begun in August 2015. She briefly co-hosted a short-lived 8 p.m. ESPN Radio show, Jorge & Jen, with Jorge Sedano. Lada recalled feeling "devastated" by her early experience at ESPN but managed to secure her role at the network by acting as a "utility player" who could contribute to a variety of shows. Since 2016, she has served in long-term roles as a features reporter for College GameDay and a host for College Football Live. She has continued to appear on or guest host other ESPN shows, including Get Up and SportsCenter. A feature by Lada for E:60 about the death of college football quarterback Tyler Hilinski won a Sports Emmy Award for Outstanding Short Documentary in 2020.

Lada has remained active in regional sports media in Wisconsin. In 2020, she began co-hosting, with Gabe Neitzel and Mark Chmura, a morning sports show for the ESPN radio affiliate WKTI in Milwaukee. In 2022–23, she served as the host for a weekly WKTI radio show featuring Marquette men's basketball coach Shaka Smart.

== Personal life ==
Lada married Dario Melendez, sports director at WISN-TV in Milwaukee, in 2017; a previous marriage ended in divorce. She has three children, two with Melendez. A recreational endurance athlete, she has run multiple marathons and triathlons.
