= Paul Albert Zipfel =

American Roman Catholic bishop (1935–2019)

His Excellency, The Most Reverend Paul Albert Zipfel
- Bishop of Bismarck
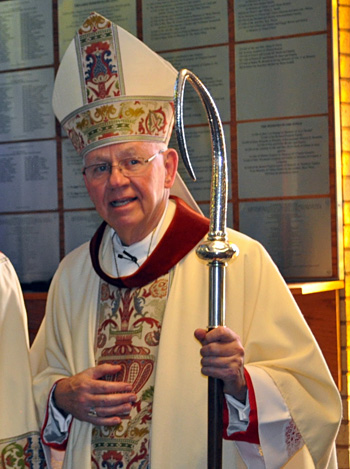
- Bishop Zipfel in 2010
- See: Diocese of Bismarck
- Appointed: December 31, 1996
- Installed: February 20, 1997
- Term ended: October 19, 2011
- Predecessor: John Francis Kinney
- Successor: David Kagan
- Previous posts: Auxiliary Bishop of St. Louis; 1989 to 1996.

Orders
- Ordination: March 18, 1961
- Consecration: June 29, 1989 by John L. May, Edward Joseph O'Donnell, and J. Terry Steib

Personal details
- Born: September 22, 1935 St. Louis, Missouri, U.S.
- Died: July 14, 2019 (aged 83) Missouri, U.S.
- Education: Kenrick Seminary; Catholic University of America; Saint Louis University

Styles of Paul Albert Zipfel
- Reference style: His Excellency; The Most Reverend
- Spoken style: Your Excellency
- Religious style: Bishop

Paul Albert Zipfel (September 22, 1935 – July 14, 2019) was an American prelate of the Roman Catholic Church. He served as the sixth bishop of the Diocese of Bismarck in North Dakota from 1997 to 2011. Zipfel served as an auxiliary bishop of the Archdiocese of Saint Louis in Missouri from 1989 to 1996.

== Biography ==
=== Early life ===
Paul Zipfel was born on September 22, 1935, in St. Louis, Missouri, to Albert and Leona (née Rau) Zipfel. He had two older siblings, Ralph and Marion. Paul Zipfel attended St. Michael's Elementary School from 1940 to 1949, and afterwards entered the St. Louis Preparatory Seminary. Zipfel then studied at Kenrick Seminary in Shrewsbury, Missouri (1955–1957) and the Catholic University of America in Washington, D.C. (1957–1961).

=== Priesthood ===
Zipfel was ordained to the priesthood by Cardinal Joseph Elmer Ritter for the Archdiocese of St. Louis on March 18, 1961 in the Cathedral of Saint Louis in St. Louis.

Zipfel obtained his Licentiate of Sacred Theology in June 1961 and completed his graduate studies at Saint Louis University from 1963 to 1965, earning a Master of Education. From 1961 to 1989, Zipfel did pastoral work in the archdiocese as an associate pastor, pastor, teacher and administrator at various schools and parishes.

=== Auxiliary Bishop of St. Louis ===
On May 16, 1989, Zipfel was appointed auxiliary bishop of St. Louis and titular bishop of Walla Walla by Pope John Paul II. He received his episcopal consecration on June 29, 1989m from Archbishop John May, with Bishops O'Donnell and Steib serving as co-consecrators.

=== Bishop of Bismarck ===
Zipfel was named the sixth Bishop of Bismarck, North Dakota, on December 31, 1996, being installed on February 20, 1997.

Within the United States Conference of Catholic Bishops, Zipfel sat on the Administrative Committee and the Priestly Life and Ministry Committee.

In June 2002, Zipfel introduced a zero tolerance policy of sexual abuse allegations against priests in the diocese. Anyone accused of abuse would be immediately removed from active ministry and reported to the police for investigation.

=== Retirement and legacy ===
Zipfel's resignation as bishop of the Diocese of Bismarck was accepted by Pope Benedict XVI on October 19, 2011, and he was succeeded by David Kagan. In retirement, Bishop Zipfel took up residence in Saint Joseph's Hall at the University of Mary in Bismarck, where he provided sacramental and spiritual service to students.

In 2012, Zipfel was diagnosed with dementia. His family and the Diocese of Bismarck decided to move him back to St. Louis to be closer to family. Zipfel lived at Mother of Good Counsel Home in Normandy, Missouri. Zipfel died on July 14, 2019.

== See also ==
- Catholic Church hierarchy
- Catholic Church in the United States
- Historical list of the Catholic bishops of the United States
- List of Catholic bishops of the United States
- Lists of patriarchs, archbishops, and bishops

== Episcopal succession ==
Catholic Church titles
Preceded by John Francis Kinney	Bishop of Bismarck; 1996–2011	Succeeded by David Kagan
Preceded by –	Auxiliary Bishop of St. Louis; 1989–1996	Succeeded by –
