= Trinity High School (Dickinson, North Dakota) =

Trinity Catholic Schools

Location
- 810 Empire Road; Dickinson, (Stark County), North Dakota 58601; United States; 46°53′28″N 102°47′55″W

Information
- Type: Private, coeducational
- Religious affiliation: Roman Catholic
- Established: 1961
- President: Marya Skaare
- Grades: 7–12
- Average class size: 20 (K-4) 60-80 (5-12)
- Colors: Red and white
- Song: "Across the Field"
- Sports: Football, Cross Country, Basketball, Volleyball, Track and Field, and Golf
- Mascot: Titan
- Website: trinitycatholicschools.com

Trinity High School is a Roman Catholic high school located in Dickinson, North Dakota. It is located in the Roman Catholic Diocese of Bismarck. It currently serves about 800 students and is a part of the Trinity Catholic Schools system.

== Athletics ==
The athletic teams at Trinity are called the Titans.

=== Championships ===
- North Dakota Class B high school boys' basketball: 2004, 2006
- North Dakota Class A high school football: 1979
- North Dakota Class AA high school football: 2000, 2001, 2005
- State Class B boys' track and field: 2002, 2003, 2006, 2018

== Notable alumni ==
- Jake Kubas, NFL guard for the New York Giants
