= Dale Henegar =

American politician

Member of the North Dakota House of Representatives from the 30th district
- In office December 1, 1990 – September 6, 1999
- Succeeded by: Dave Weiler

Personal details
- Born: January 6, 1923 Mitchell, South Dakota
- Died: September 6, 1999 (aged 76) Bismarck, North Dakota
- Party: Republican

Dale Henegar (January 6, 1923 – September 6, 1999) was an American politician who served in the North Dakota House of Representatives from the 30th district from 1990 until his death in 1999.

He died on September 6, 1999, in Bismarck, North Dakota at age 76.
