= KZRX =

Radio station in Dickinson, North Dakota

- Dickinson, North Dakota; United States
- Broadcast area: Dickinson, North Dakota
- Frequency: 92.1 MHz
- Branding: Z92.1

Programming
- Format: Active rock
- Affiliations: Premiere Networks

Ownership
- Owner: iHeartMedia, Inc.; (iHM Licenses, LLC)
- Sister stations: KCAD, KLTC

History
- First air date: August 15, 1983
- Former call signs: KRRB (1983–1998)

Technical information
- Licensing authority: FCC
- Facility ID: 57741
- Class: C3
- ERP: 17,000 watts
- HAAT: 122 meters (400 ft)
- Transmitter coordinates: 46.936°N 102.732°W

Links
- Public license information: Public file; LMS
- Webcast: Listen Live
- Website: kzrx921.iheart.com

KZRX (92.1 FM), known as "Z-92.1", is a radio station broadcasting an active rock format serving Western North Dakota from Dickinson, North Dakota. The station is currently owned by iHeartMedia, Inc.

== History ==
The station now known as KZRX signed on the air on August 15, 1983, licensed to Dickinson, North Dakota. The station broadcasts at 92.1 MHz with a power of 100,000 watts. KZRX has consistently maintained a Rock music format and is currently branded as "92.1 KZRX."

KZRX was one of the three original stations in the cluster owned by Roughrider Broadcasting, which also included KLTC (AM 1460) and KCAD (FM 99.1).

The entire cluster was sold to Roberts Radio in 1998. Following the Roberts Radio ownership, the stations were acquired by Clear Channel Communications (now iHeartMedia) in 2001, which operates the station to this day.

Former logo
