= Vincent James Ryan =

American prelate

His Excellency, The Most Reverend Vincent James Ryan
- Bishop of Bismarck
- Church: Roman Catholic Church
- See: Diocese of Bismarck
- In office: May 28, 1940 to November 10, 1951
- Predecessor: John Baptist Vincent de Paul Wehrle
- Successor: Lambert Anthony Hoch

Orders
- Ordination: June 7, 1912 by John Ireland
- Consecration: May 28, 1940 by Aloisius Joseph Muench

Personal details
- Born: July 1, 1884 Arlington, Wisconsin, US
- Died: November 10, 1951 (aged 67) Bismarck, North Dakota, US
- Education: St. Francis Seminary; Saint Paul Seminary School of Divinity

Vincent James Ryan (July 1, 1884 – November 10, 1951) was an American prelate of the Roman Catholic Church who served as bishop of the Diocese of Bismarck in North Dakota from 1940 until his death.

== Biography ==
=== Early life ===
The fourth of five children, Vincent Ryan was born on July 1, 1884, in Arlington, Wisconsin, to Thomas Ryan and Ann Welch Ryan. He was raised on the family farm, and attended high school in Lodi, Wisconsin, for two years. In 1902, Ryan entered St. Francis Seminary in Milwaukee, Wisconsin. From 1906 to 1912, he studied at Saint Paul Seminary School of Divinity in St. Paul, Minnesota. Seeking a career as a missionary, he was accepted by North Dakota's Bishop John Shanley into the Diocese of Fargo.

=== Priesthood ===
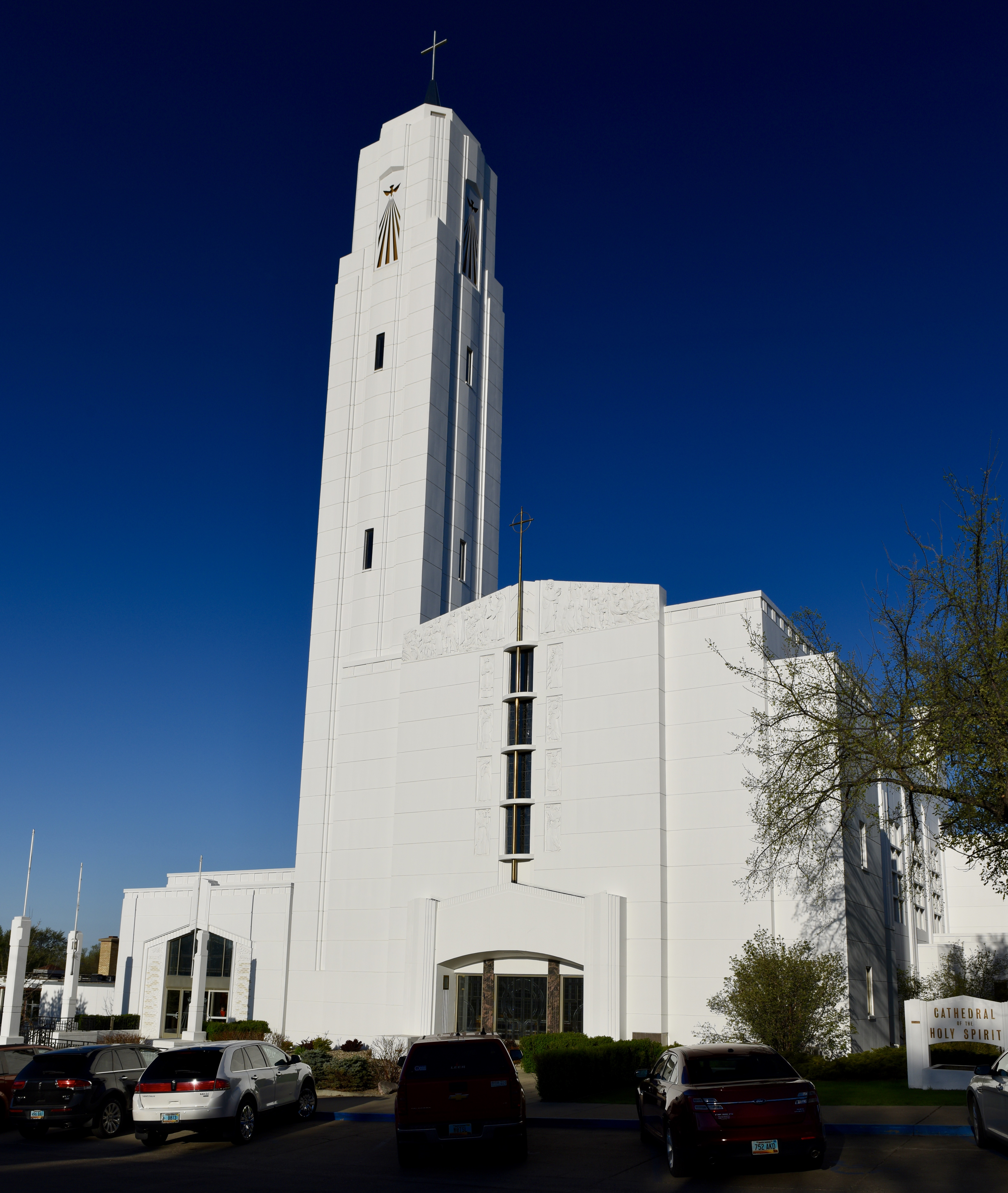
Cathedral of the Holy Spirit, Bismarck, North Dakota (2017)

Ryan was ordained to the priesthood in St. Paul for the Diocese of Fargo by Archbishop John Ireland on June 7, 1912.

Following his arrival in North Dakota a month later, Ryan served, until 1936, as chancellor of the diocese and private secretary to Bishop James O'Reilly. In addition to these duties, he erected St. Anthony's Parish in Fargo, North Dakota, where he served as pastor from 1917 to 1936. Ryan also organized and served as the first director of the Catholic Welfare Bureau, which became one of the most important charities in the state. He was vicar general of the diocese from 1939 to 1940, and was raised by the Vatican to the rank of domestic prelate in 1939. Ryan was elected president of the National Catholic Rural Life Conference in 1941, and co-authored Manifesto of Rural Life. He held a Bachelor of Sacred Theology from The Catholic University of America in Washington, D.C.

=== Bishop of Bismarck ===
On March 19, 1940, Ryan was appointed the second bishop of Bismarck by Pope Pius XII. He received his episcopal consecration on May 28, 1940, from Bishop Aloisius Muench, with Bishops Joseph Busch and Thomas Welch serving as co-consecrators, at St. Mary's Cathedral in Fargo. He was installed the next day by Archbishop John Murray. During his 11-year tenure, Ryan constructed 69 church buildings for a total cost of over ten million dollars. Among these buildings was the Cathedral of the Holy Spirit, which was dedicated in August 1945. Ryan founded the diocesan newspaper, Dakota Catholic Action, in 1941. He opposed the 1948 "anti-garb" law passed by the North Dakota Legislative Assembly, which prohibited nuns from wearing their religious habit while teaching in public schools in North Dakota.

=== Death and legacy ===
Ryan died on November 10, 1951, at age 67 in Bismarck. His burial was at the city's St. Mary's Cemetery.

== Episcopal succession ==
Catholic Church titles
Preceded by John Baptist Vincent de Paul Wehrle	Bishop of Bismarck; 1940—1951	Succeeded by Lambert Anthony Hoch
