= Elks Club and Store Building–Dickinson Lodge No. 1137 =

- Elks Club and Store Building--Dickenson Lodge #1137
- U.S. National Register of Historic Places
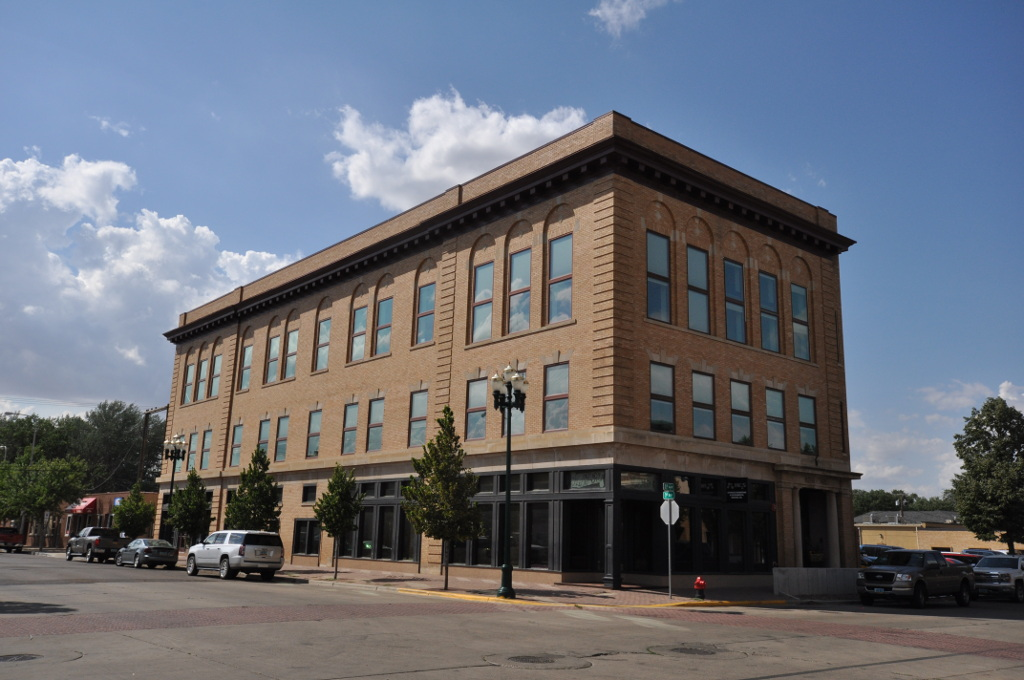

- Location within North Dakota Location within the United States
- Location: 103 1st Ave. W., Dickinson, North Dakota
- Coordinates: 46.88006°N 102.78728°W
- Area: less than one acre
- Built: 1913
- Built by: Heaton, George, Lumber Co. et al
- Architect: Claude & Starck
- Architectural style: Early Commercial
- NRHP reference No.: 08000280
- Added to NRHP: April 11, 2008

The Elks Club and Store Building—Dickenson Lodge #1137, also known as Elks Club or Elks Building, is an Early Commercial building in Dickinson, North Dakota, United States. It was built in 1913. It has been used as a meeting hall, a specialty store, and a business. The building was listed on the National Register of Historic Places in 2008.

The building also hosted the Dickinson Normal School, predecessor of Dickinson State University.

The building was vacant for more than 20 years. The city of Dickinson took ownership of the building in December 2001. EPA Brownfields Cleanup grant funding of $200,000 assisted in abatement of asbestos, lead, and mold; the city contributed $94,000 in cleanup completed in 2005.
