= KDIX =

- Dickinson, North Dakota; United States
- Frequency: 1230 kHz (HD Radio)
- Branding: The Classic 1230

Programming
- Format: Classic hits
- Affiliations: ABC News Radio

Ownership
- Owner: Starrdak, Inc.

History
- First air date: May 16, 1947
- Call sign meaning: Dickinson

Technical information
- Licensing authority: FCC
- Facility ID: 62361
- Class: C
- Power: 1,000 watts (unlimited)
- Transmitter coordinates: 46°52′21″N 102°44′38″W
- Repeater: 100.7 K264CV (Dickinson)

Links
- Public license information: Public file; LMS
- Webcast: Listen live
- Website: www.kdix.net

KDIX (1230 AM, "The Classic 1230") is a radio station licensed to serve Dickinson, North Dakota, United States. It airs a classic hits music format and carries network news from ABC News Radio. The station is also heard on translator station K264CV (100.7 FM) in Dickinson. KDIX is owned by Starrdak, Inc.

== History ==
KDIX radio first went on the air May 16, 1947, with 250 watts of power. It was purchased by Lee and Darlene Leiss in 1992 and the format was changed from Top 40 adult contemporary, to country rock and songs from the 1970s through the 1980s. This format change was to increase focus on the main age demographic of the area. Sports, local news and agriculture information, are the station's main programming features.

One of the best known radio voices in North Dakota, Rod Kleinjan has been on the air since 1972 serving Dickinson and the southwest North Dakota region with daily news, weather, and sports updates.

The station was assigned the KDIX call letters by the Federal Communications Commission.

KDIX was an affiliate of CBS News Radio until the network's closure in 2026; it was replaced by ABC News Radio.
