= David Kagan =

American Catholic bishop (born 1949)

His Excellency, The Most Reverend David Dennis Kagan
- Bishop of Bismarck
- See: Diocese of Bismarck
- Appointed: October 19, 2011
- Installed: November 30, 2011
- Predecessor: Paul Albert Zipfel
- Previous post: Vicar general of the Diocese of Rockford

Orders
- Ordination: June 14, 1975 by Arthur Joseph O'Neill
- Consecration: November 30, 2011 by John Clayton Nienstedt, Paul Albert Zipfel, and Thomas G. Doran

Personal details
- Born: November 9, 1949 (age 76) Waukegan, Illinois, US
- Denomination: Roman Catholic
- Education: Loras College/St. Pius X Seminary; Pontifical Gregorian University
- Motto: Nihil amori Christi praeponere (Put nothing before the love of Christ)

Styles of David Dennis Kagan
- Reference style: His Excellency; The Most Reverend
- Spoken style: Your Excellency
- Religious style: Bishop

David Dennis Kagan (born November 9, 1949) is an American Catholic prelate who has served as Bishop of Bismarck since 2011.

== Biography ==
=== Early life and education ===
David Kagan was born on November 9, 1949, in Waukegan, Illinois, and grew up in Spring Grove, Illinois. He received his primary education at Saint Peter School in Spring Grove. Deciding to become a priest, Kagan entered the Salvatorian Seminary, a minor seminary in St. Nazianz, Wisconsin. He then studied philosophy at Loras College/St. Pius X Seminary in Dubuque, Iowa.

=== Priesthood ===
Kagan was ordained into the priesthood at the Cathedral of Saint Peter in Rockford, Illinois, by Bishop Arthur O'Neill on June 14, 1975, for the Diocese of Rockford. After his 1975 ordination, the diocese assigned Kagan as parochial vicar of Saint Patrick Parish in Dixon, Illinois, and as a teacher of religious education at Newman Central Catholic High School in Sterling, Illinois.

Kagan went to Rome in 1977 to enter the seminary at the Pontifical North American College. He received a Licentiate of Canon Law from the Pontifical Gregorian University in Rome in 1979. After returning to Illinois, Kagan held the following positions within the diocese:

- Teacher of religious education at Boylan Catholic High School in Rockford and vice-official of the diocesan tribunal (1979 to 1984)
- Judicial vicar (1984 to 1994)
- Parish administrator of Saint Anne Parish in Warren and of Saint Joseph Parish at Apple River (1984 to 1985)
- Chaplain at the Corpus Christi Monastery of the Poor Clares and parish vicar at St Peter's Cathedral Parish, both in Rockford (1985 to 1986)
- Pastor of Saint Mary Parish in Byron and ethics teacher at Saint Anthony College of Nursing in Rockford (1986 to 1989)
- Pastor of the Proto-Cathedral of St James in Rockford (1990 to 1994)

Kagan served as president of the presbyteral council and editor of the diocesan weekly paper. He was admitted to the Equestrian Order of the Holy Sepulchre of Jerusalem as a knight commander in March 1995. In 1994, Kagan was named vicar general and moderator of the curia for the diocese by his bishop, as well as honorary prelate by the Vatican. In 2011, the Vatican elevated Kagan to the rank of protonotary apostolic.

=== Bishop of Bismarck ===
Kagan was named bishop of Bismarck by Pope Benedict XVI on October 19, 2011, following the retirement of Bishop Paul Zipfel. He was consecrated at Bismarck's Cathedral of the Holy Spirit on Wednesday, November 30, 2011. Archbishop John Nienstedt was the principal consecrator. Zipfel and Bishop Thomas G. Doran were the principal co-consecrators.

Kagan in 2015 ended the affiliation between the diocese and Boy Scouts of America, citing policy changes that allowed gay men to serve as scout leaders and volunteers.In June 2022, Kagan announced that the diocese would investigate the life of Michelle Duppong, a missionary from North Dakota, as part of a possible campaign for her beatification and canonization.

== See also ==
- Catholic Church hierarchy
- Catholic Church in the United States
- Historical list of the Catholic bishops of the United States
- List of Catholic bishops of the United States
- Lists of patriarchs, archbishops, and bishops

== Episcopal succession ==
Catholic Church titles
Preceded by Paul Albert Zipfel	Bishop of Bismarck; 2011–	Succeeded by Incumbent
