= KLTC =

Radio station in Dickinson, North Dakota

Dickinson, North Dakota; United States
- Frequency: 1460 kHz
- Branding: Big Country To Boot 1460 KLTC

Programming
- Format: Classic country
- Affiliations: NBC News Radio; Minnesota Twins Radio Network; Minnesota Vikings Radio Network; NDSU Football

Ownership
- Owner: iHeartMedia, Inc.; (iHM Licenses, LLC)
- Sister stations: KCAD, KZRX

History
- First air date: July 4, 1978
- Call sign meaning: Keep Lovin' Thy Country

Technical information
- Licensing authority: FCC
- Facility ID: 71870
- Class: B
- Power: 5,000 watts day 770 watts night
- Transmitter coordinates: 46°50′54″N 102°49′49″W

Links
- Public license information: Public file; LMS
- Webcast: Listen Live
- Website: 1460kltc.iheart.com

KLTC (1460 AM) is a radio station broadcasting an Information/classic country format serving Western and Southwestern North Dakota, Southeastern Montana and Northwestern South Dakota and Northeast Wyoming from Dickinson, North Dakota. The station is currently owned by iHeartMedia, Inc.

KLTC is an NBC News Radio affiliate and airs news at the top of the hour 24 hours a day. KLTC airs the Dakota News Network for North Dakota News and The PJ sports show weekday mornings at 7:40. KLTC is also a Minnesota Twins Baseball affiliate and a Minnesota Vikings Football affiliate. KLTC also airs North Dakota State Boson football.

== History ==
KLTC began broadcasting on July 4, 1978. At that time, there was only one radio station broadcasting 18 hours a day with a Top 40/AC format in Dickinson and signed off at midnight. The nearest receivable radio stations in the daytime were Baker, Montana, Bismarck, North Dakota, Lemmon, South Dakota, and Williston, North Dakota at night reception of these radio station were limited at best. Roughrider Broadcasting Company decided that Dickinson and Southwestern North Dakota needed a radio station that broadcast 24 hours a day hence KLTC was born. KLTC Radio was the First 5,000 Watt station west of the Missouri River in North Dakota. KLTC has been formatted with country music ever since, except for a brief period in 2004 when KLTC was formatted oldies. KLTC was originally owned by Roughrider Broadcasting until 1998, when Roberts Radio bought the properties and in 2001 Clear Channel Communications acquired KLTC along with sister stations KCAD and KZRX. KLTC stands for Keep Lovin' Thy Country. KLTC Radio is proud to have Paul Quinn who is a radio legend in Southwest North Dakota and has been broadcasting on KLTC since March 1979. Paul had worked every shift on KLTC starting with overnights and is now the morning host. Big Country To Boot was the Original slogan when KLTC Signed on and now in its 36th year The Boot is Back...the slogan has returned to what it was back in 1978.
