= Jake Kubas =

American football player (born 2000)

No. 63 – Dallas Cowboys
- Position: Guard
- Roster status: Practice squad

Personal information
- Born: August 13, 2000 (age 26); Dickinson, North Dakota, U.S.
- Listed height: 6 ft 4 in (1.93 m)
- Listed weight: 308 lb (140 kg)

Career information
- High school: Trinity (Dickinson)
- College: North Dakota State (2018–2023)
- NFL draft: 2024: undrafted

Career history
- New York Giants (2024–2025); New England Patriots (2026)*; Dallas Cowboys (2026–present)*
- * Offseason or practice squad member only

Awards and highlights
- 3× FCS national champion (2018, 2019, 2021); First-team FCS All-American (2023); First team All-MVFC (2023)

Career NFL statistics as of 2025
- Games played: 5
- Games started: 3
- Stats at Pro Football Reference

Jake Kubas (born August 13, 2000) is an American professional football guard for the Dallas Cowboys of the National Football League (NFL). He played college football for the North Dakota State Bison and was signed by the Giants as an undrafted free agent in 2024.

== Early life ==
Kubas was born on August 13, 2000, in Dickinson, North Dakota. His father and brother each played football for the North Dakota State Bison. He attended Dickinson Trinity High School in Dickinson, where he competed in football, basketball and track, also being a member of the National Honor Society. He played three years on the Titans football team, two as a starter, and was a two-time team captain, being named a first-team all-conference selection as a junior and a first-team all-state selection as a senior. He graduated from Trinity in 2018 and walked-on to play college football for North Dakota State University.

== College career ==
Kubas redshirted as a freshman at North Dakota State in 2018. He was a member of the team that won the 2018 FCS national championship. He appeared in five games during the 2019 season as a reserve, winning a second national championship. Kubas saw action in three games during the 2020–21 season before missing the remainder due to injury. He started all 15 games in the 2021 season at right guard, helping the team average 280.6 rushing yards per game while winning another national championship.

Kubas was put on scholarship in 2022 and received an undergraduate degree in sport management that year. He started all 15 games during the 2022 season at right guard. He returned for a final season in 2023 and started 14 games, being team captain and being selected first-team All-Missouri Valley Football Conference (MVFC) and first-team FCS All-American by Stats Perform. He ended his collegiate career with 44 starts, all in his last three seasons.

At North Dakota State, Kubas was also a top student. He was a six-time MVFC Honor Roll selection, the 2019 recipient of the conference's academic excellence award and an FCS academic all-star. He was a member of the National Football Foundation Hampshire Honor Society, was a two-time CSC Academic All-District selection and a 2023 second-team MVFC Scholar-Athlete.

== Professional career ==
Pre-draft measurables
Height	Weight	Arm length	Hand span	Wingspan	40-yard dash	10-yard split	20-yard split	20-yard shuttle	Vertical jump	Broad jump	Bench press
6 ft 3 7/8 in (1.93 m)	308 lb (140 kg)	32 5/8 in (0.83 m)	8 7/8 in (0.23 m)	6 ft 8 in (2.03 m)	5.22 s	1.78 s	2.94 s	4.65 s	31.0 in (0.79 m)	9 ft 0 in (2.74 m)	28 reps
All values from Pro Day

=== New York Giants ===
After going unselected in the 2024 NFL draft, Kubas signed a three-year, $2.86 million contract with the New York Giants on May 11, 2024. After impressing in training camp and preseason, he made the team's initial 53-man roster for the 2024 season.

On August 26, 2025, Kubas was waived by the Giants as part of final roster cuts and re-signed to the practice squad the next day.

On January 7, 2026, he signed a reserve/futures contract with the Giants. On August 30, Kubas was waived by the Giants as a part of final roster cuts.

=== New England Patriots ===
On September 1, 2026, Kubas was signed to the New England Patriots' practice squad. He was released on November 3.

=== Dallas Cowboys ===
On November 19, 2026, Kubas signed with the Dallas Cowboys practice squad.
