= KXDI =

Radio station in Belfield–Dickinson, North Dakota

Belfield, North Dakota; United States
- Broadcast area: Dickinson, North Dakota
- Frequency: 93.9 MHz
- Branding: "I-94"

Programming
- Format: Country

Ownership
- Owner: Andrew Sturlaugson; (P&A Media LLC)
- Sister stations: KQLZ

History
- First air date: January 10, 2013
- Call sign meaning: Dickinson

Technical information
- Licensing authority: FCC
- Facility ID: 189497
- Class: C1
- ERP: 100,000 watts
- HAAT: 253.6 meters (832 ft)
- Transmitter coordinates: 46°43′31″N 102°55′0.4″W

Links
- Public license information: Public file; LMS
- Webcast: Listen live
- Website: web.kxdikqlz.com/kxdi-93-9/

KXDI (93.9 FM, "I-94") is a radio station broadcasting a country format serving Western and Central North Dakota and eastern Montana from Dickinson, North Dakota (licensed to nearby Belfield). The station is owned by Andrew Sturlaugson's P&A Media.

== History ==
KXDI first signed on the air in January 2013. The "I-94" moniker alludes to Interstate 94, which goes through Dickinson. Since signing on January 10, 2013, the station has enjoyed unprecedented success for a startup commercial FM station.

Founding owner Stephen Marks died on May 11, 2022; it and KQLZ in New England had been owned by his Dickinson-Belfield Broadcasting. Andrew Sturlaugson's P&A Media acquired Marks' Montana and North Dakota radio stations, including KXDI and KQLZ, for $850,000 in 2024.
