= Diocese of Bismarck =

Latin Catholic jurisdiction in the US

Coordinates: 46°48′30″N 100°46′09″W

Diocese of Bismarck Dioecesis Bismarcquensis
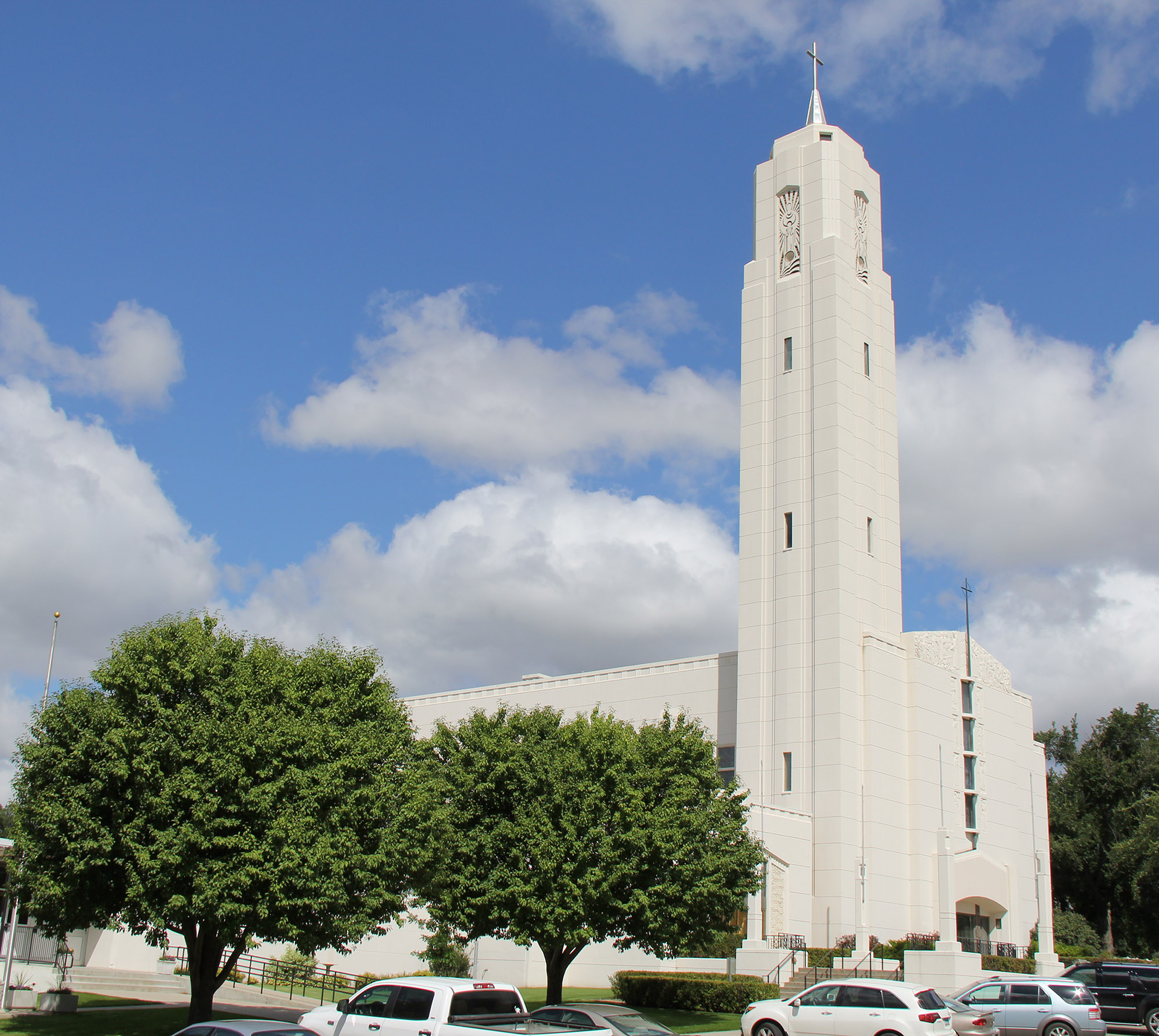
- Cathedral of the Holy Spirit

- Coat of arms

Location
- Country: United States
- Territory: 24 counties in western North Dakota
- Ecclesiastical province: Saint Paul and Minneapolis

Statistics
- Area: 88,720 km^{2} (34,250 sq mi)
- Population: Total; Catholics: (as of 2025); 280,836; 61,862 (22%)
- Parishes: 98

Information
- Denomination: Catholic
- Sui iuris church: Latin Church
- Rite: Roman Rite
- Established: December 31, 1909 (116 years ago)
- Cathedral: Cathedral of the Holy Spirit
- Patron saint: Immaculate Conception

Current leadership
- Pope: Leo XIV
- Bishop: David D. Kagan
- Metropolitan Archbishop: Bernard Hebda

Map
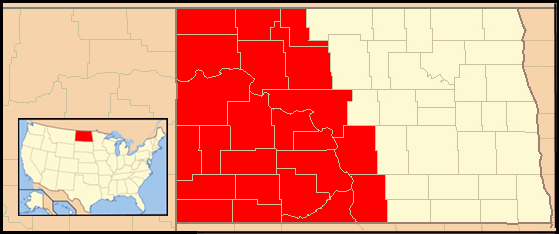

Website
- bismarckdiocese.com

The Diocese of Bismarck (Latin: Dioecesis Bismarckiensis) is a diocese of the Catholic Church in western North Dakota in the United States. It is a suffragan diocese of the metropolitan Archdiocese of Saint Paul and Minneapolis. The bishop is David Kagan. The mother church of the diocese is Cathedral of the Holy Spirit.

== Territory ==
The Diocese of Bismarck encompasses 24 North Dakota counties that cover 34,000 square miles. It has a total population over 280,836 people, with approximately 61,862 Catholic church members.

== History ==
=== 1800 to 1900 ===
The first Catholic presence in present-day North Dakota was in 1818. Archbishop Joseph-Octave Plessis of the Archdiocese of Quebec sent a priest to visit Fort Pembina, a settlement of several French-Canadian families from the Red River Colony of present-day Manitoba.

At that time, the Dakotas has been acquired by the United States from Spain in the Louisiana Purchase of 1803. However, the Catholic hierarchy in the United States did not assert authority over the area until later in the 19th century. The Bismarck area would then be under the following jurisdictions.

- Diocese of Saint Louis (1826 to 1837)
- Diocese of Dubuque (1837 to 1850)
- Diocese of Saint Paul (1850 to 1879)
- Vicariate Apostolic of Dakota (1879 to 1889)
- Diocese of Jamestown (later Fargo) (1889 to 1909)

The first representative of the Catholic Church in the United States to reach the Dakotas was Pierre-Jean De Smet, a Jesuit missionary who stopped near the Missouri River in 1840 to minister to the Mandan nation.

In 1847, the Archdiocese of Quebec assigned the priest Georges-Antoine Belcourt to Pembina as a missionary to the Chippewa and Métis in the Fort Pembina area. Upon arrival at Pembina, Belcourt constructed a small log cabin 20 by 30 feet (6.1 by 9.1 m) as a chapel, which was not large enough for all of his congregation. On August 14, 1848, Belcourt performed his first baptism in Pembina, and held a communion class for 92 Native Americans.

The first Catholic church in western North Dakota was the Church of the Immaculate Conception, dedicated in Bismarck in 1875. In 1893, the Benedictine Order established the Assumption Priory in Devils Lake. It later became Assumption Abbey in Richardson. The first Catholic parish in Dickinson was St. Patrick's, established in 1885 for Irish workers on the railroad.

=== 1900 to 1951 ===
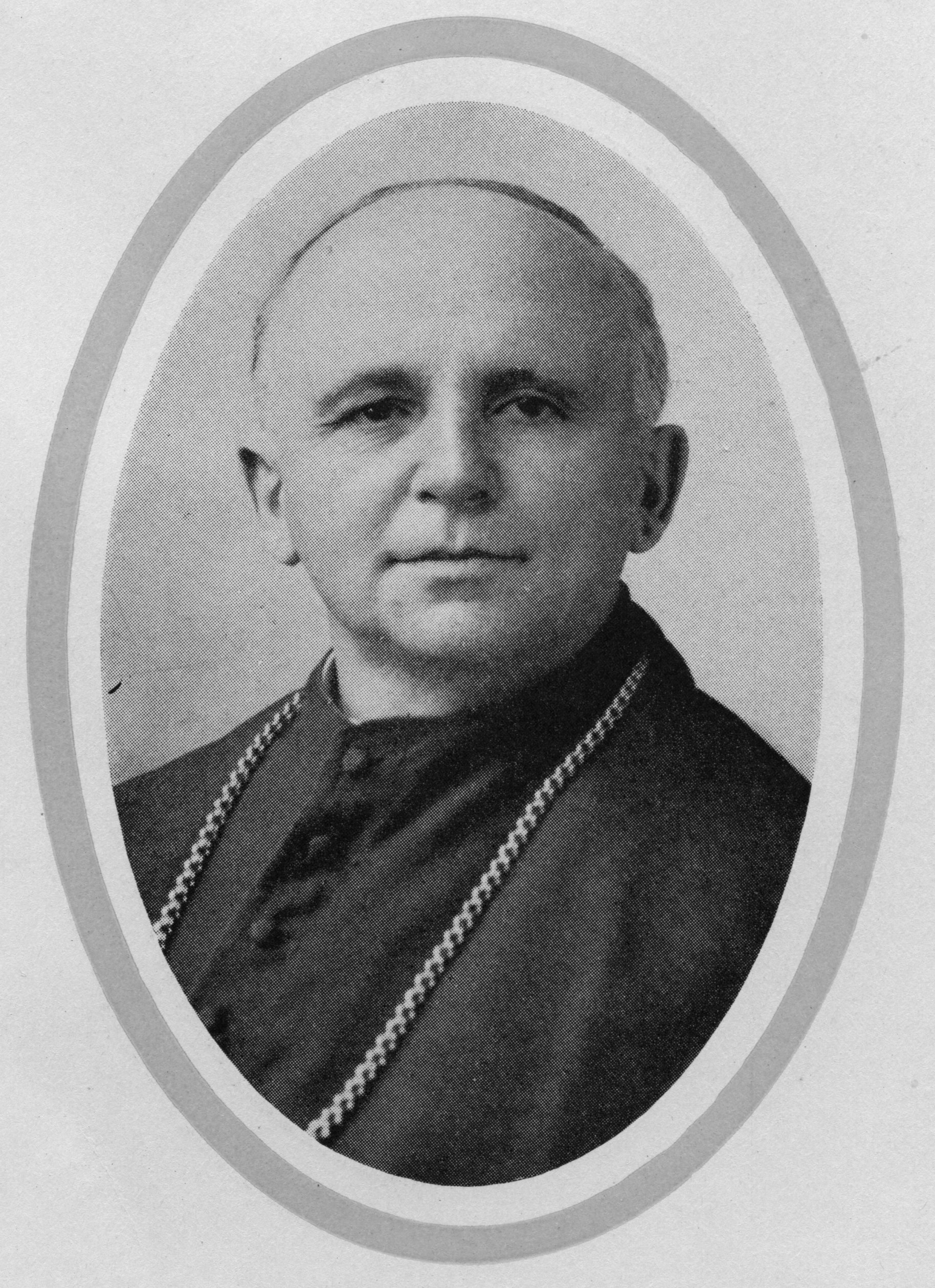
Bishop Wehrle (1913)

St. Leo the Great Church in Minot was dedicated in 1908, the first Catholic church in that town. On December 31, 1909 Pope Pius X established the Diocese of Bismarck, taking its territory from the Diocese of Fargo. He appointed Vincent de Paul Wehrle, abbot of Assumption Abbey, as the first bishop of the new diocese. During Wehrle's 29-year tenure, the Catholic population increased from 25,000 to 55,000. He constructed 55 churches and 18 parochial schools, and four hospitals were established. Wehrle established 115 new congregations. He also began construction on the Cathedral of the Holy Spirit in Bismarck, but was forced to abandon the project due to the Great Depression of the 1930s

After Wehrle retired in 1939, Pope Pius XII named Vincent Ryan of Fargo as the second bishop of Bismarck. During his 11-year tenure, Ryan oversaw construction of 69 church buildings for a total cost exceeding $10 million. Ryan founded the diocesan newspaper, Dakota Catholic Action, in 1941. The Cathedral of the Holy Spirit was dedicated in 1945. Ryan publicly opposed the 1948 "anti-garb" law passed by the North Dakota Legislative Assembly. It prohibited nuns from wearing their religious habits while teaching in public schools. Ryan died in 1951.

=== 1952 to 1982 ===
In 1952, Lambert Hoch was appointed the third bishop of Bismarck, by Pius XII. During his four-year tenure, Hoch promoted vocations to the priesthood and religious life; between 1952 and 1960, 29 priests were ordained for the diocese and 13 for Assumption Abbey in Richardton. Hoch became bishop of the Diocese of Sioux Falls in 1956.

Pius XII named Hilary Hacker as the fourth bishop of Bismarck in 1956. Hacker dedicated much of his tenure implementing the liturgical reforms from the Second Vatican Council of the early 1960s . His tenure was marked by high enrollments in Catholic schools, as well as the founding of Bishop Ryan High School in Minot and Trinity High School in Dickinson. He established an annual appeal called God's Share; between 1956 and 1963, the annual collection rose from $165,000 to $225,000. Hacker retired in 1982.

=== 1982 to present ===
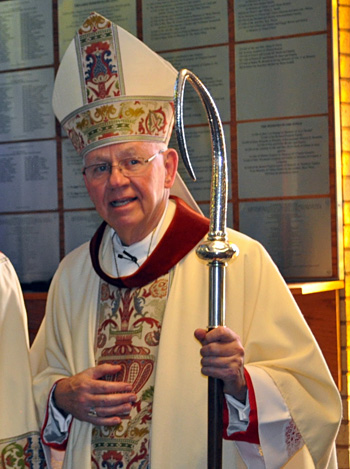
Bishop Zipfel (2010)

The next bishop of Bismarck was Auxiliary Bishop John Kinney of Saint Paul and Minneapolis, named by Pope John Paul II in 1982. Kinney became bishop of the Diocese of Saint Cloud in 1995. Auxiliary Bishop Paul Zipfel of the Archdiocese of Saint Louis replaced Kinney in 1997. Zipfel retired in 2011.

Pope Benedict XVI in 2011 appointed David Kagan from the Diocese of Rockford as the next bishop off Bismarck. In 2015, Kagan announced that the diocese was cutting ties with the Boy Scouts of America because it allowed gay men to serve as scout leaders and volunteers.

Kagan announced in 2022 that the diocese would investigate the life of Michelle Duppong for possible canonization. She conducted evangelical work for several years at universities and colleges in North Dakota.

=== Sex abuse ===
In 2002, Bishop Zipfel introduced a zero-tolerance policy regarding sexual abuse allegations against priests in the diocese. Under the policy, the diocese would immediately remove any clergy accused of sexual abuse from active ministry and report them to the police for investigation.

In 2019, the diocese released the names of 22 clergy with credible accusations of sexual abuse of minors since 1950. In 2020, Bishop Kagan released a list of 18 diocesan clergy and four extern clergy with credible accusations of sexual abuse of minors. He stated that the last substantiated case of sexual abuse had occurred in 1989.

== Bishops ==
=== Bishops of Bismarck ===
1. John Baptist Vincent de Paul Wehrle, O.S.B. (1910–1939)
2. Vincent James Ryan (1940–1951)
3. Lambert Anthony Hoch (1952–1956), appointed Bishop of Sioux Falls
4. Hilary Baumann Hacker (1956–1982)
5. John Francis Kinney (1982–1995), appointed Bishop of Saint Cloud
6. Paul Albert Zipfel (1996–2011)
7. David D. Kagan (2011–Present)

=== Other diocesan priests who became bishops ===
- Sylvester William Treinen, appointed Bishop of Boise City in 1962
- Austin Anthony Vetter, appointed Bishop of Helena in 2019

== Schools ==
As of 2025, the Diocese of Bismarck has three high schools and 11 elementary schools or preschools.

- Bishop Ryan Catholic School – Minot
- St. Mary's Central High School – Bismarck
- Trinity Junior High and High School – Dickinson
