= KCAD =

Radio station in Dickinson, North Dakota

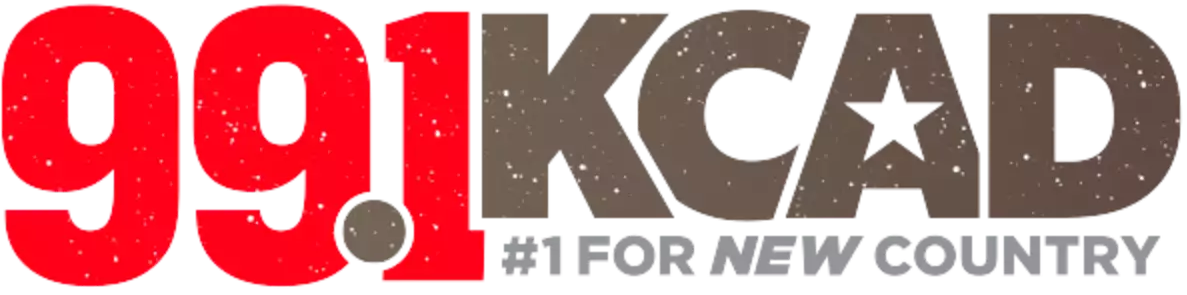

Dickinson, North Dakota; United States
- Frequency: 99.1 MHz
- Branding: 99.1 KCAD

Programming
- Format: Country music
- Affiliations: Premiere Networks

Ownership
- Owner: iHeartMedia; (iHM Licenses, LLC)
- Sister stations: KLTC; KZRX

History
- First air date: November 20, 1996

Technical information
- Licensing authority: FCC
- Facility ID: 57740
- Class: C1
- ERP: 100,000 watts
- HAAT: 122 meters (400 ft)
- Transmitter coordinates: 46.936°N 102.732°W

Links
- Public license information: Public file; LMS
- Webcast: Listen live (via iHeartRadio)
- Website: 991kcad.iheart.com

KCAD (99.1 FM) is a radio station broadcasting a country music format serving western and central North Dakota, parts of northwest South Dakota and eastern Montana from Dickinson, North Dakota. The station is owned by iHeartMedia. KCAD signed on the air in November 1996 and was the first FM country station in southwestern North Dakota.

== History ==
The station now known as KCAD signed on the air on November 20, 1996, bringing the first major Country music format to the Southwestern North Dakota market. It broadcasts at 99.1 MHz with a substantial effective radiated power of 100,000 watts, licensed to Dickinson, North Dakota.

KCAD was initially owned by Roughrider Broadcasting, which operated a cluster of stations in the Dickinson market alongside KLTC (AM 1460) and KZRX (FM 92.1).

The entire cluster was sold to Roberts Radio in 1998, as part of a move to consolidate ownership in smaller regional markets.

The stations were later acquired by Clear Channel Communications (now iHeartMedia) in 2001, which has operated KCAD and its sister stations ever since.
