= Cathedral of the Holy Spirit (Bismarck, North Dakota) =

Catholic cathedral in North Dakota, US

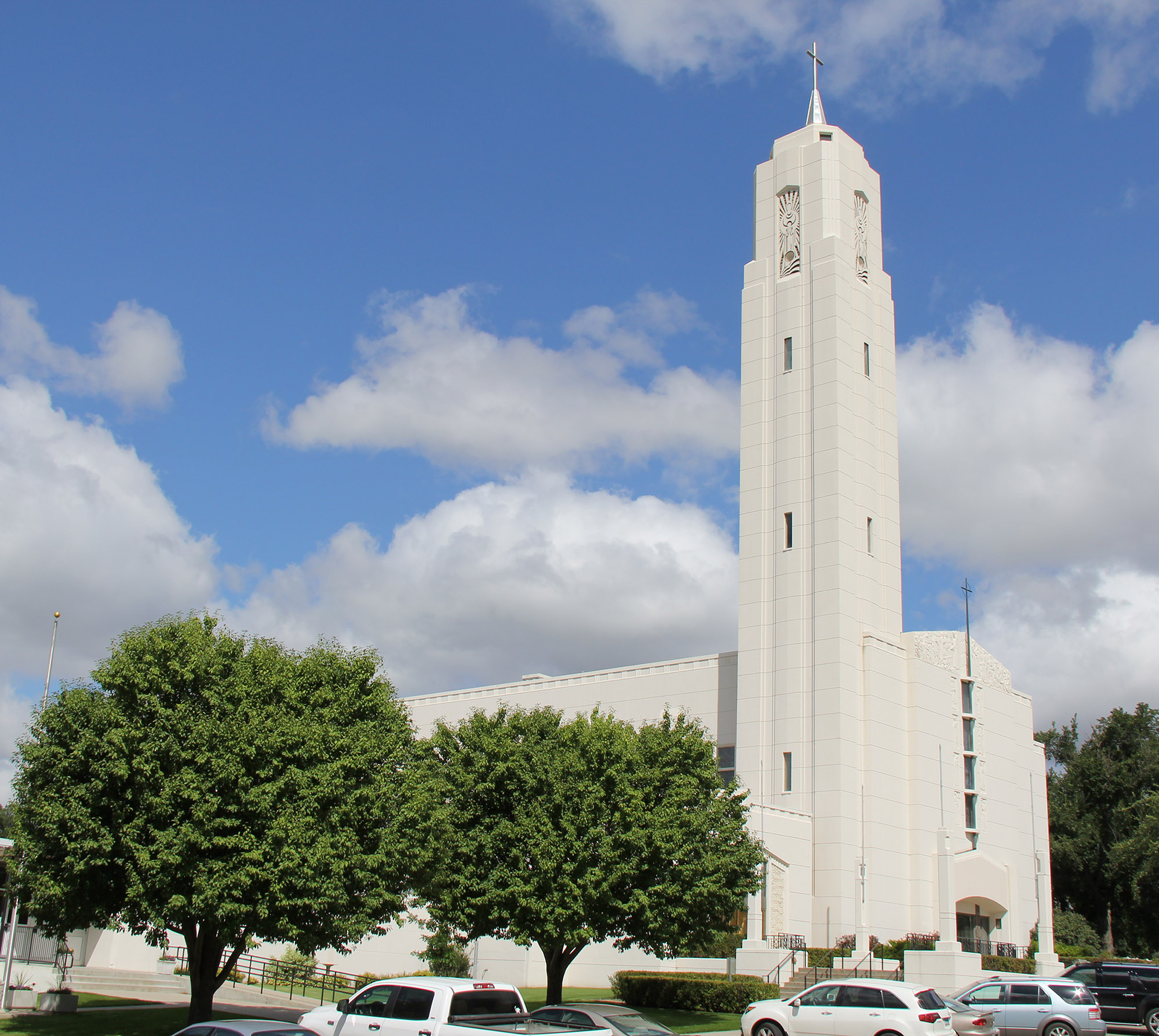

- Location in North Dakota Cathedral of the Holy Spirit (the United States)
- 46°48′38″N 100°47′47″W
- Location: 520 Raymond Street; Bismarck, North Dakota
- Country: United States
- Denomination: Catholic Church
- Sui iuris church: Latin Church
- Website: www.cathedralparish.com

History
- Status: Cathedral/Parish church
- Founded: 1945
- Dedication: August 30, 1945

Architecture
- Architect: William F. Kurke
- Style: Art Deco
- Groundbreaking: September, 1941
- Completed: 1945

Specifications
- Materials: Concrete

Administration
- Diocese: Bismarck

Clergy
- Bishop: Most Rev. David Kagan
- Rector: Fr. Nicholas Vetter
- Cathedral of the Holy Spirit
- U.S. Historic district – Contributing property
- Part of: Bismarck Cathedral Area Historic District (ID80002908)
- Added to NRHP: May 8, 1980

The Cathedral of the Holy Spirit is a cathedral and parish church of the Catholic Church located in Bismarck, North Dakota, in the United States. It is the seat of the Diocese of Bismarck. Since 1980, the cathedral and the nearby Bishop's Residence have been contributing properties in the Bismarck Cathedral Area Historic District on the National Register of Historic Places.

== History ==
During the 1910s Vincent Wehrle, the first bishop of Bismarck, began planning to build a cathedral. He brought the property in Bismarck in 1917 and hired the Milwaukee architect Anton Dohman in 1921 to design the cathedral. He provided two different designs; the first was similar to the church at Assumption Abbey in Richardton, North Dakota. However, Wehrle was forced to postpone the project.

In 1940, Bismarck's second bishop, Vincent Ryan, restarted the cathedral project. He hired Fargo architect William F. Kurke to provide some new designs. Ryan choose an Art Deco style for the new building. The groundbreaking was held in September 1941. The Cathedral of the Holy Spirit was dedicated 1945, but its interior decorations were added in later years.

The grade school was completed in 1951 and the convent in 1955. The rectory was completed in 1969. The diocese renovated the cathedral in 1992, added a gathering space. ln 2024, the diocese installed a new pipe organ in the choir loft of the cathedral.

== Cathedral architecture ==
The cathedral is composed of monolithic concrete, and is believed to be the only Art Deco-style cathedral in the United States. The cathedral's tall bell tower is a local landmark that is visible from a distance.

== Attendant buildings ==
- In addition to the cathedral, Kurke also designed the nearby bishop's residence. The two-story, concrete, Art Deco structure was built at the same time as the cathedral.
- The two-story grade school features a flat roof, precast concrete panels, and two horizontal window bands that run about two-thirds of the width of the facade. A school building between the cathedral and the residence was originally part of Kurke's plan, but the long and low building features a more contemporary style that differs from the original plans.
- The rectory exterior is composed of brick on the first floor and vertical siding on the second floor.
- The convent now houses the Center for Pastoral Ministry of the diocese.
Images of cathedral campus

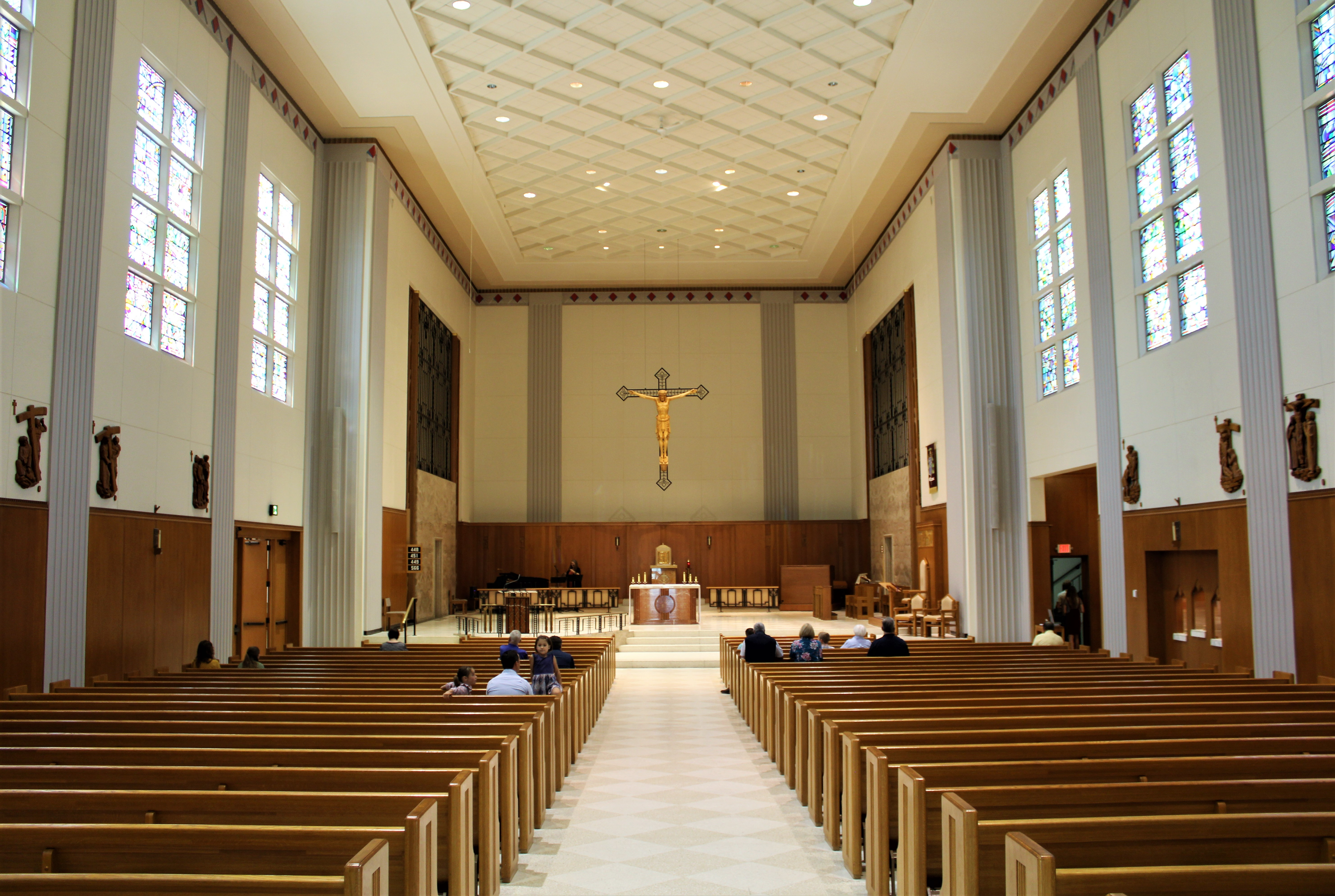
View of the chancel, cathedral (2022)

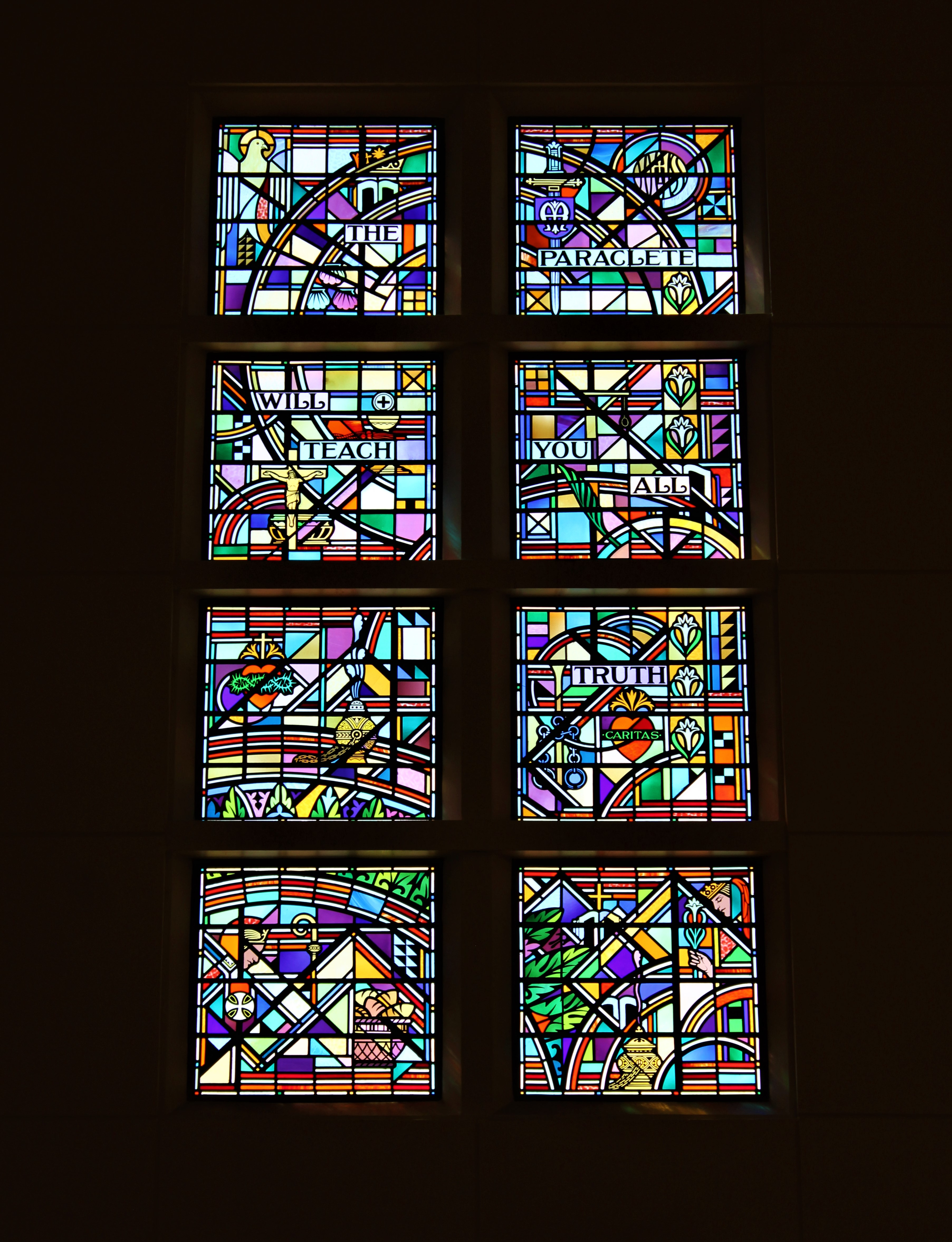
Stained glass window, cathedral (2022)

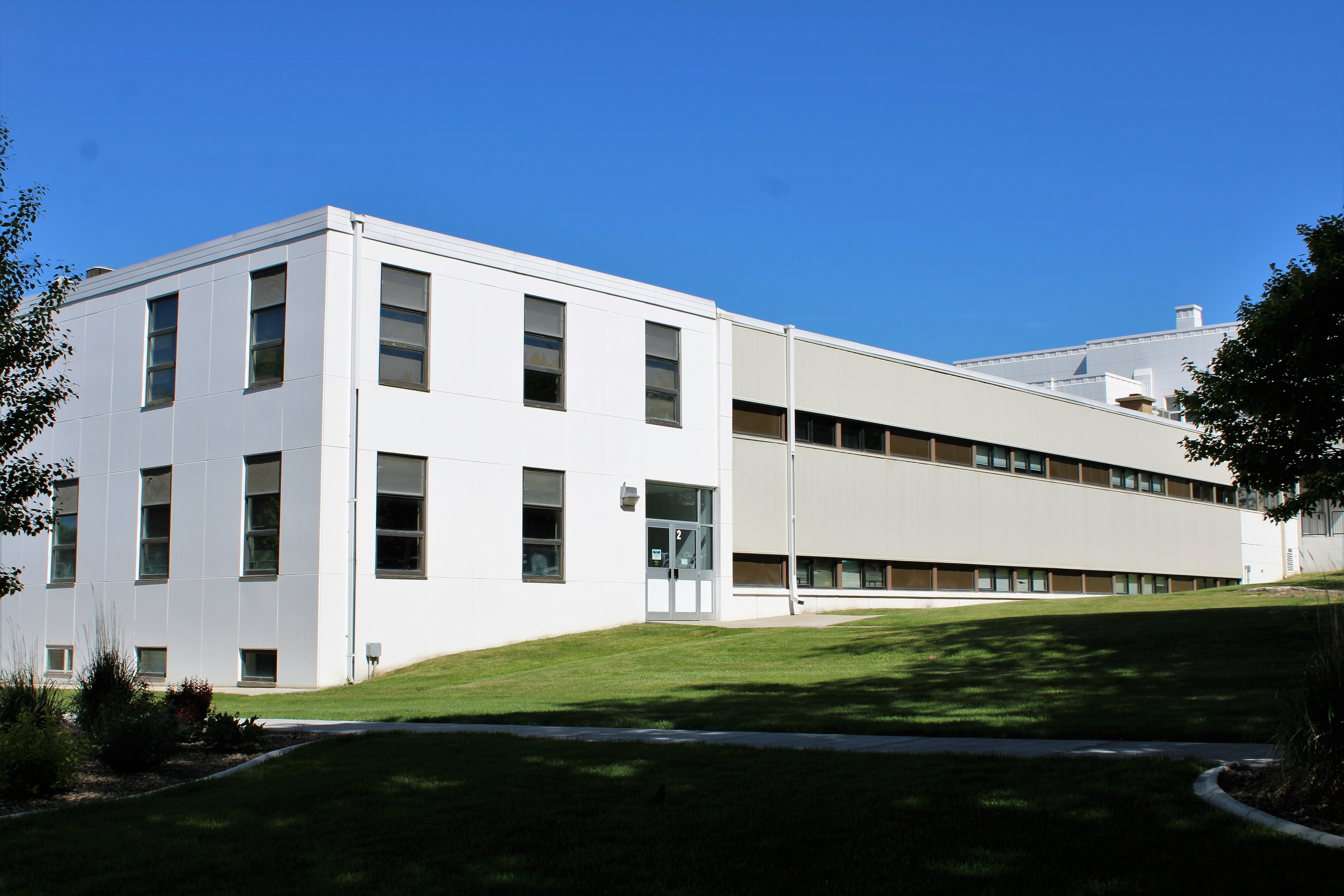
Cathedral of the Holy Spirit School (2022)

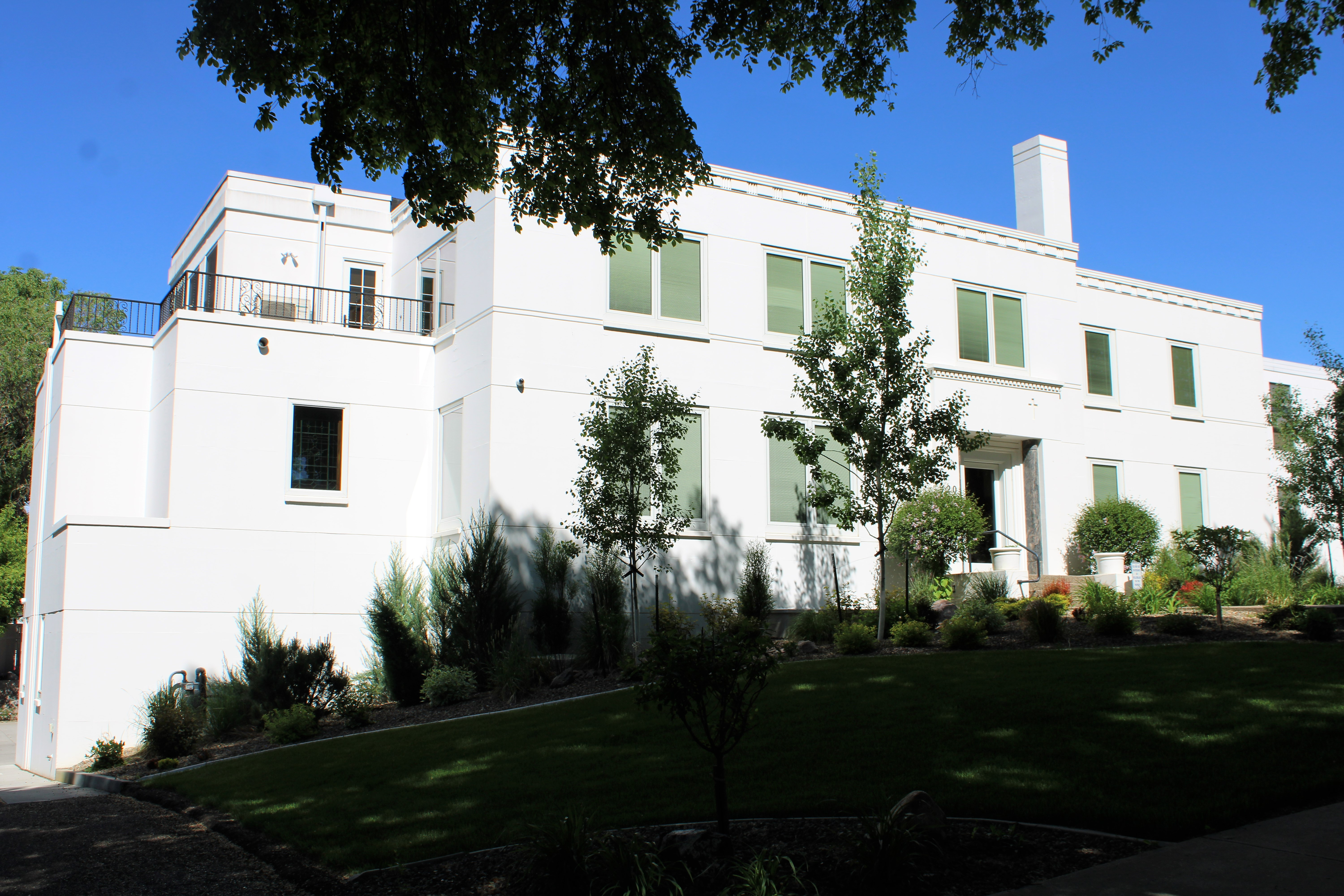
Bishop's residence (2022)

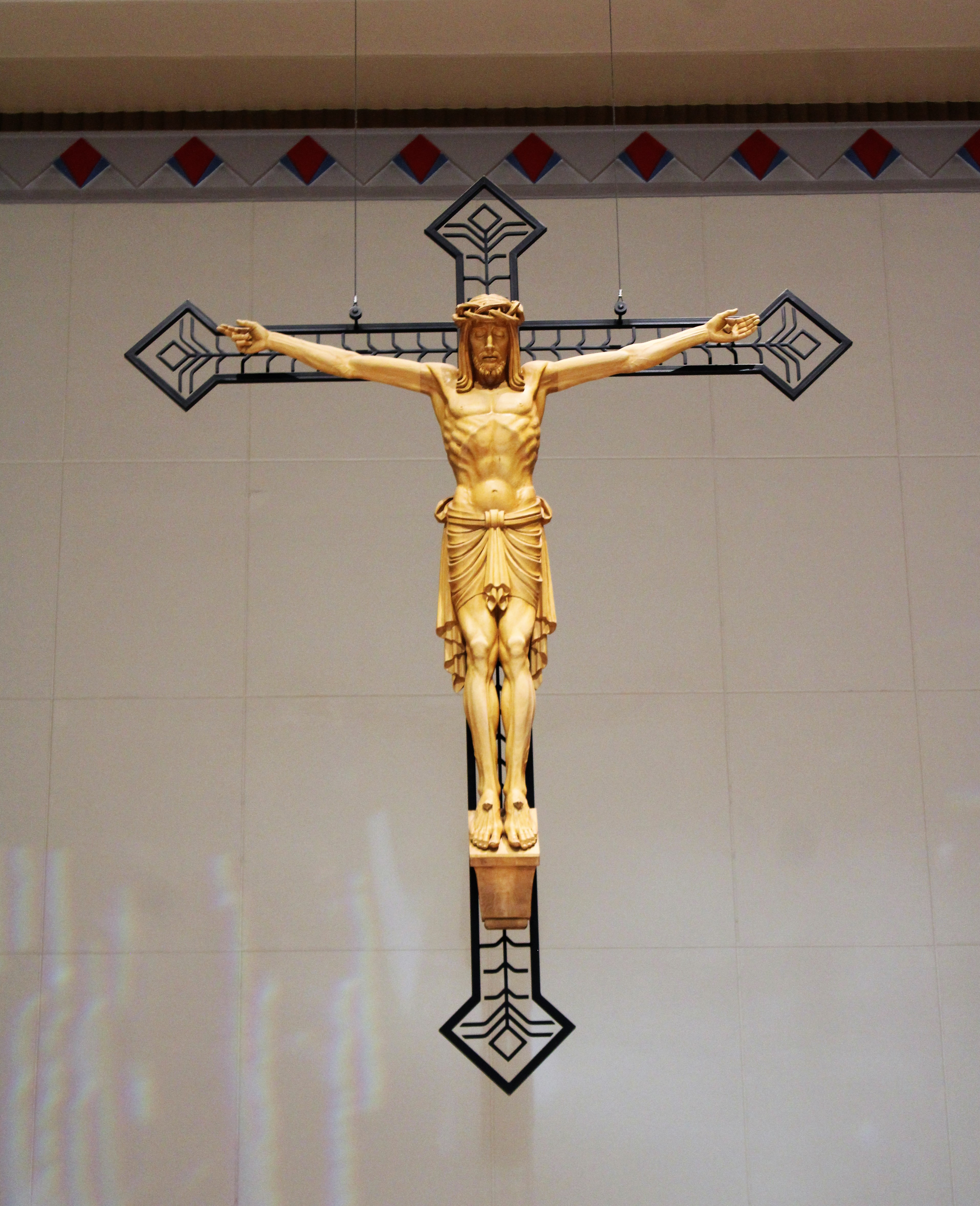
Crucifix (2022)

== See also ==
- List of Catholic cathedrals in the United States
- List of cathedrals in the United States
