= Richmond Township, Illinois =

Coordinates: 42°27′07″N 88°17′51″W

Richmond Township
- Township
- Location in McHenry County
- Country: United States
- State: Illinois
- County: McHenry
- Established: November 6, 1849

Area
  - Total: 32.86 sq mi (85.1 km^{2})
  - Land: 32.67 sq mi (84.6 km^{2})
  - Water: 0.19 sq mi (0.49 km^{2}) 0.58%

Population (2010)
  - Estimate (2016): 6,610
  - Density: 204.5/sq mi (79.0/km^{2})
- Time zone: UTC-6 (CST)
  - Summer (DST): UTC-5 (CDT)
- FIPS code: 17-111-63654
- Website: www.richmondtownship.org

Richmond Township is located in McHenry County, Illinois. As of the 2010 census, its population was 6,683 and it contained 2,685 housing units. It includes the census-designated place of Solon Mills.

== Geography ==
According to the 2010 census, the township has a total area of 32.86 square miles (85.1 km^{2}), of which 32.67 square miles (84.6 km^{2}) (or 99.42%) is land and 0.19 square miles (0.49 km^{2}) (or 0.58%) is water.

== Demographics ==
Historical population
Census	Pop.	Note	%±
2016 (est.)	6,610
U.S. Decennial Census
