= Vincent de Paul Wehrle =

Monk and Bishop of Bismarck

His Excellency, The Most Reverend Vincent de Paul Wehrle OSB
- Bishop of Bismarck; Titular Bishop of Teos
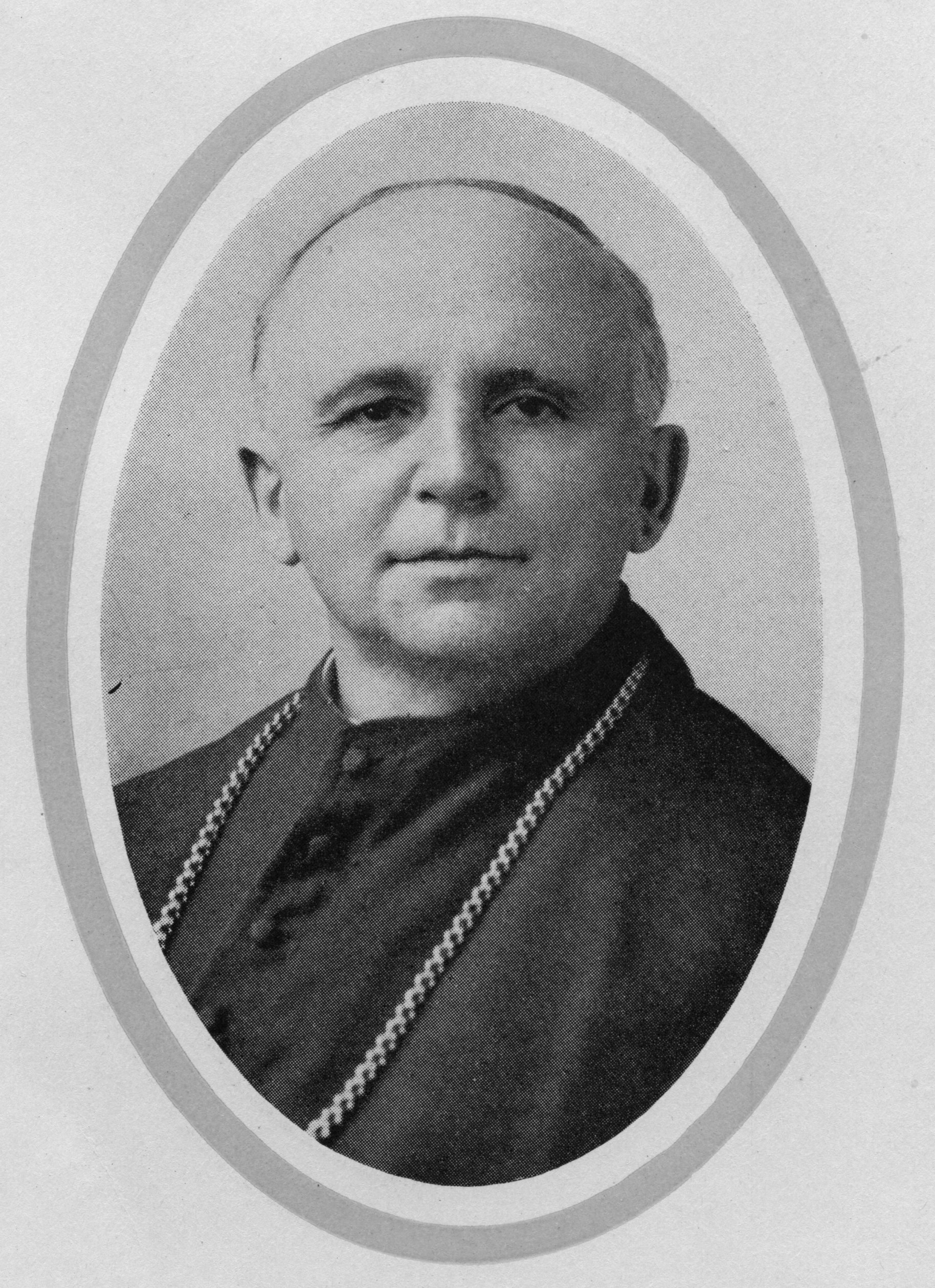
- Bishop Wehrle in 1913
- Church: Roman Catholic Church
- See: Diocese of Bismarck
- In office: May 19, 1910; December 11, 1939
- Successor: Vincent James Ryan

Orders
- Ordination: April 23, 1882 by Franz Konstantin Rampa
- Consecration: May 19, 1910 by John Ireland

Personal details
- Born: Johann Baptist Wehrle; December 19, 1855 Berg, St. Gallen, Switzerland
- Died: November 2, 1941 (aged 85) Bismarck, North Dakota, US

Vincent de Paul Wehrle, O.S.B., (December 19, 1855 – November 2, 1941) was a Swiss-born Benedictine monk and prelate of the Roman Catholic Church. His birth name was Johann Baptist Wehrle.

Wehrle served as the first bishop of the new Diocese of Bismarck in North Dakota from 1910 to 1939.

== Biography ==
=== Early life ===
Vincent Wehrle was born on December 19, 1855, in Berg, St. Gallen, Switzerland to Johann Baptist and Elisabeth (née Hafner) Wehrle. He studied at the minor seminary of St. Gallen for four years, when it was closed down by an anti-clerical state government. He then studied at Einsiedeln Abbey for two years. He made his profession as a member of the Order of St. Benedict (Benedictines) at Einsiedeln on December 3, 1876.

=== Priesthood ===
Wehrle was ordained to the priesthood by Bishop Franz Konstantin Rampa at Einsiedeln on April 23, 1882. That same year, the Benedictines sent Wehrle to the United States, where he joined Subiaco Abbey in Logan County, Arkansas. He later went to St. Meinrad Abbey in Spencer County, Indiana.

In 1887, Wehrle was assigned to the Vicariate Apostolic of Dakota, which contained present day North and South Dakota. He was named chancellor of the vicariate by Bishop Martin Mary. After laboring as a missionary among the Native Americans in Yankton, South Dakota, he was assigned as pastor of the mission church in Devils Lake, North Dakota. He there founded St. Gall's Priory in 1893, and was elected as its first prior. He later established Assumption Abbey at Richardton, North Dakota, where he was abbot, in 1903. He also established new parishes in the surrounding towns of Mott, Richardton, Lefor, and Strasburg, all in North Dakota

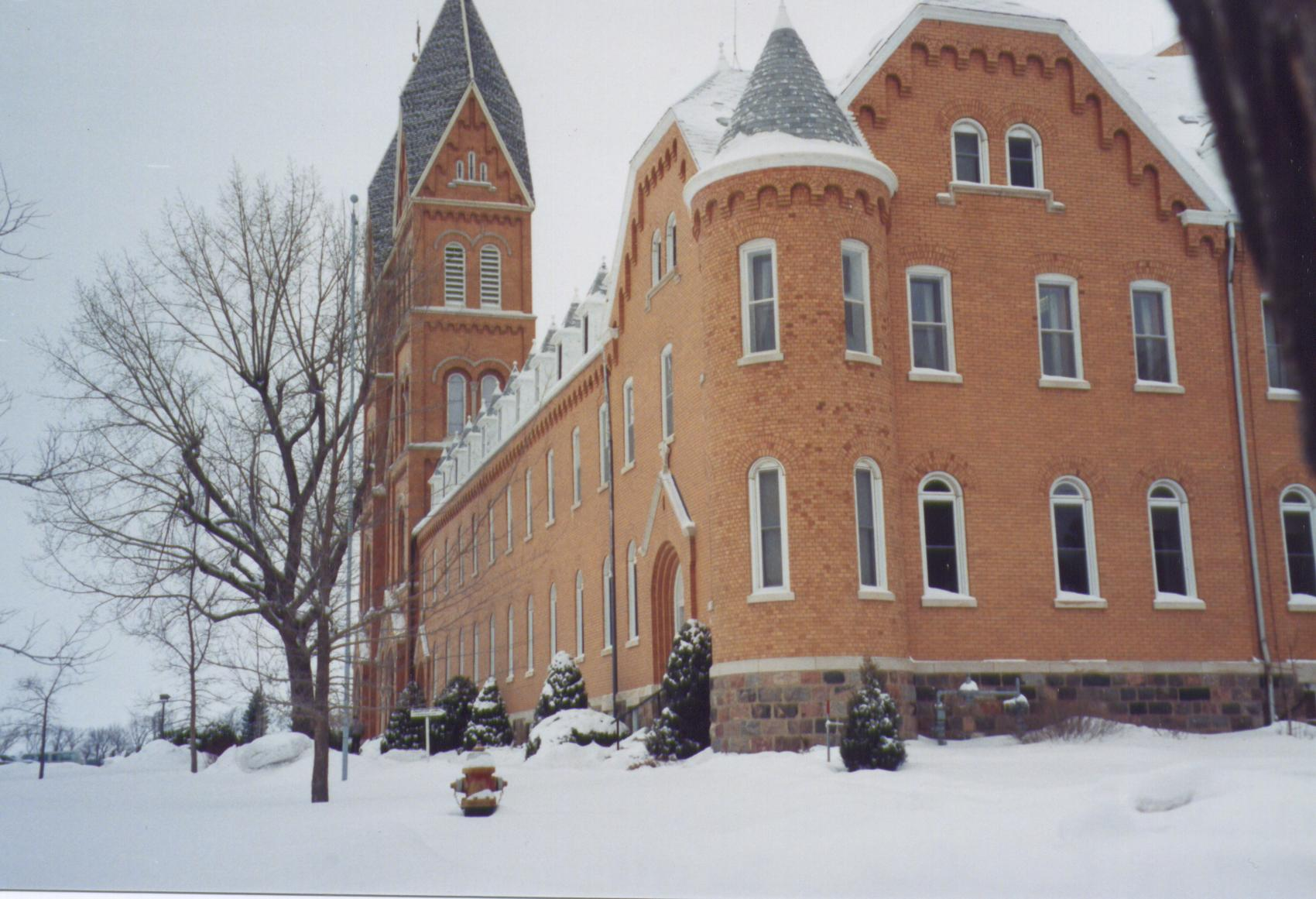
Assumption Abbey, Richardton, North Dakota (2008)

=== Bishop of Bismarck ===
On April 9, 1910, Wehrle was appointed the first bishop of the newly erected Diocese of Bismarck by Pope Pius X. He received his episcopal consecration on May 19, 1910, from Archbishop John Ireland, with Bishops James McGolrick and James Trobec serving as co-consecrators, at the chapel of Saint Paul Seminary in St. Paul, Minnesota. His installation took place on June 16, 1910, and was attended by North Dakota Governor John Burke.

During his 29-year-long tenure, Wehrle presided over a period of great growth for the church. From 1910 to 1939, the number of Catholics increased from 25,000 to 55,000; and 55 churches, 115 congregations, 18 parochial schools, and four hospitals were established. He also began construction on the Cathedral of the Holy Spirit, but was forced to abandon his efforts due to the financial shortfall caused in the 1930s by the Great Depression.

By 1937, Wehrle's health had begun to fail and he became a patient at St. Alexius Hospital in Bismarck.

=== Retirement and legacy ===
Pope Pius XII accepted Wehrle's resignation as resigned as bishop of Bismarck on December 11, 1939, and appointed him titular bishop of Teos on the same date.

Vincent Wehrle died in Bismarck on November 2, 1941, at age 85. He is interred at the Assumption Abbey Church Crypt in Richardton, North Dakota.

Catholic Church titles
Preceded by none	Bishop of Bismarck; 1910—1939	Succeeded by Vincent James Ryan
