= St. Pius X Seminary (Dubuque, Iowa) =

- Motto: Pro Deo et Patria
- Motto in English: For God and Country
- Type: Seminary
- Established: 1839
- Founders: Bishop Mathias Loras
- Parent institution: Loras College
- Religious affiliation: Roman Catholic Archdiocese of Dubuque
- Chancellor: Archbishop Thomas Robert Zinkula
- Rector: Fr. David Schatz
- Location: Dubuque, Iowa, United States; 42.4852°N 90.6754°W
- Website: loras.edu

St. Pius X Seminary is associated with Loras College, Dubuque, Iowa, and run under the auspices of the Archdiocese of Dubuque. The seminary prepares Minor (College) Seminarians for the priesthood, specifically preparing candidates for entrance into Major Seminary & Theological studies. Through Loras, the seminary provides full training in Philosophical studies, while giving students the necessary religious studies courses required for entrance into Major Seminary. Founded in 1839 by Bishop Mathias Loras as St. Raphael Seminary, the seminary has operated under various names and conditions at Loras College until adopting its present name in 1954. St. Pius X has prepared countless Seminarians across Iowa & surrounding states for the priesthood, counting over 30 Bishops as alumni. Currently, the seminary is housed at the Vianney House and serves Seminarians of the Archdiocese of Dubuque and the Diocese of Des Moines. The current rector of St. Pius X Seminary is Fr. David Schatz and the spiritual director is Fr. Tom McDermott.
