= KQLZ (FM) =

Radio station in New England–Dickinson, North Dakota

- New England, North Dakota; United States
- Broadcast area: Dickinson, North Dakota; Belfield, North Dakota
- Frequency: 95.7 MHz
- Branding: "Q-Rock 95"

Programming
- Format: Classic rock

Ownership
- Owner: Andrew Sturlaugson; (P&A Media LLC)
- Sister stations: KXDI

History
- First air date: 2008
- Former call signs: KCVD (2006–2012); KLTQ (2012–2013)

Technical information
- Licensing authority: FCC
- Facility ID: 164305
- Class: C2
- ERP: 27,500 watts
- HAAT: 175 meters (574 ft)
- Transmitter coordinates: 46°43′31″N 102°55′1.6″W

Links
- Public license information: Public file; LMS
- Webcast: Listen live
- Website: web.kxdikqlz.com

KQLZ (95.7 MHz) is an FM radio station in Dickinson, North Dakota, United States (licensed to New England). The station is owned by Andrew Sturlaugson's P&A Media.

The station was first licensed in 2008 as KCVD, eventually becoming KLTQ and then KQLZ. It operated at low power until 2019, when it fully launched as a classic rock station.

== History ==
The station was first licensed in 2008, and was originally operated at low power by the non-commercial Horizon Broadcast Network as KCVD. Synergy Broadcast North Dakota bought KCVD and KHRY in Beulah for $65,000 in 2011; both stations were silent at the time.

In December 2012, the Federal Communications Commission (FCC) approved a move of the station, by then KLTQ, from New England to Beulah; its signal would reach the edge of Bismarck. KQLZ (the former KHRY) would in turn relocate from 97.9 in Beulah to 98.1 in New England and serve Dickinson. By February 2016, the stations had swapped call signs and abandoned their relocation plans; Synergy Broadcast then sold KQLZ for $70,000 to Dickinson-Belfield Broadcasting, owner of KXDI in Belfield and part of the group of companies owned by Stephen Marks. KLTQ was separately sold to DSN Radio, owners of KDKT in Beulah.

After temporarily simulcasting KXDI and upgrading the station's signal, the Marks Radio Group fully launched KQLZ in May 2019 with a classic rock format. Stephen Marks died on May 11, 2022. Andrew Sturlaugson's P&A Media acquired Marks' Montana and North Dakota radio stations, including KQLZ and KXDI, for $850,000 in 2024.
