= KDKT =

Radio station in Beulah–Bismarck, North Dakota

Coordinates: 47°17′15″N 101°45′46″W

- Beulah, North Dakota; United States
- Broadcast area: Bismarck-Mandan
- Frequency: 1410 kHz
- Branding: KDKT Sports Radio

Programming
- Format: Sports
- Affiliations: Fox Sports Radio; Westwood One Sports

Ownership
- Owner: Digital Syndicate Network

History
- First air date: December 18, 1978 (as KHOL)
- Former call signs: KHOL (1978–2006)
- Call sign meaning: K North DaKoTa

Technical information
- Licensing authority: FCC
- Facility ID: 41175
- Class: B
- Power: 1,000 watts day 189 watts night
- Translator: 106.5 K293CS (Beulah)

Links
- Public license information: Public file; LMS
- Webcast: Listen Live
- Website: kdktsports.com

KDKT (1410 AM) is a radio station that serves as west central North Dakota's sports talk outlet, as "KDKT SportsRadio". KDKT covers a large portion of western North Dakota, including key cities such as Bismarck, Dickinson and Minot. "KDKT Sports Radio" also carries regional, and local sports teams from North Dakota such as the University of North Dakota, Fargo-Moorhead RedHawks, Bismarck State College, and NDHSAA prep sports. Local on-air personalities include Jeff Baranick, Jim Kusler, Nathaniel Jones, Josh Coleman, and Jimmy Covers who have hosted the popular Friday Night Live program.

== History and ownership ==
The station, licensed to Beulah, North Dakota, first signed on the air on December 18, 1978, with the original call sign KHOL. The station was originally owned by Mercer Broadcasting Inc. and featured a country music format, which it branded as "Coal Country," reflecting the major industry in the area. with a country music format known as "Coal Country" which reflected the coal industry in Western North Dakota. In 2000, the station dropped Country in favor of an adult contemporary music format. In 2006, DSN Radio acquired the station changed call letters to KDKT and flipped the format to sports, with the popular CBS Sports Radio network. Today KDKT is North Dakota's affiliate of the Westwood One Sports network. The KDKT call sign is derived from "K North DaKoTa."

Former logo
