= Dickinson, North Dakota =

- City
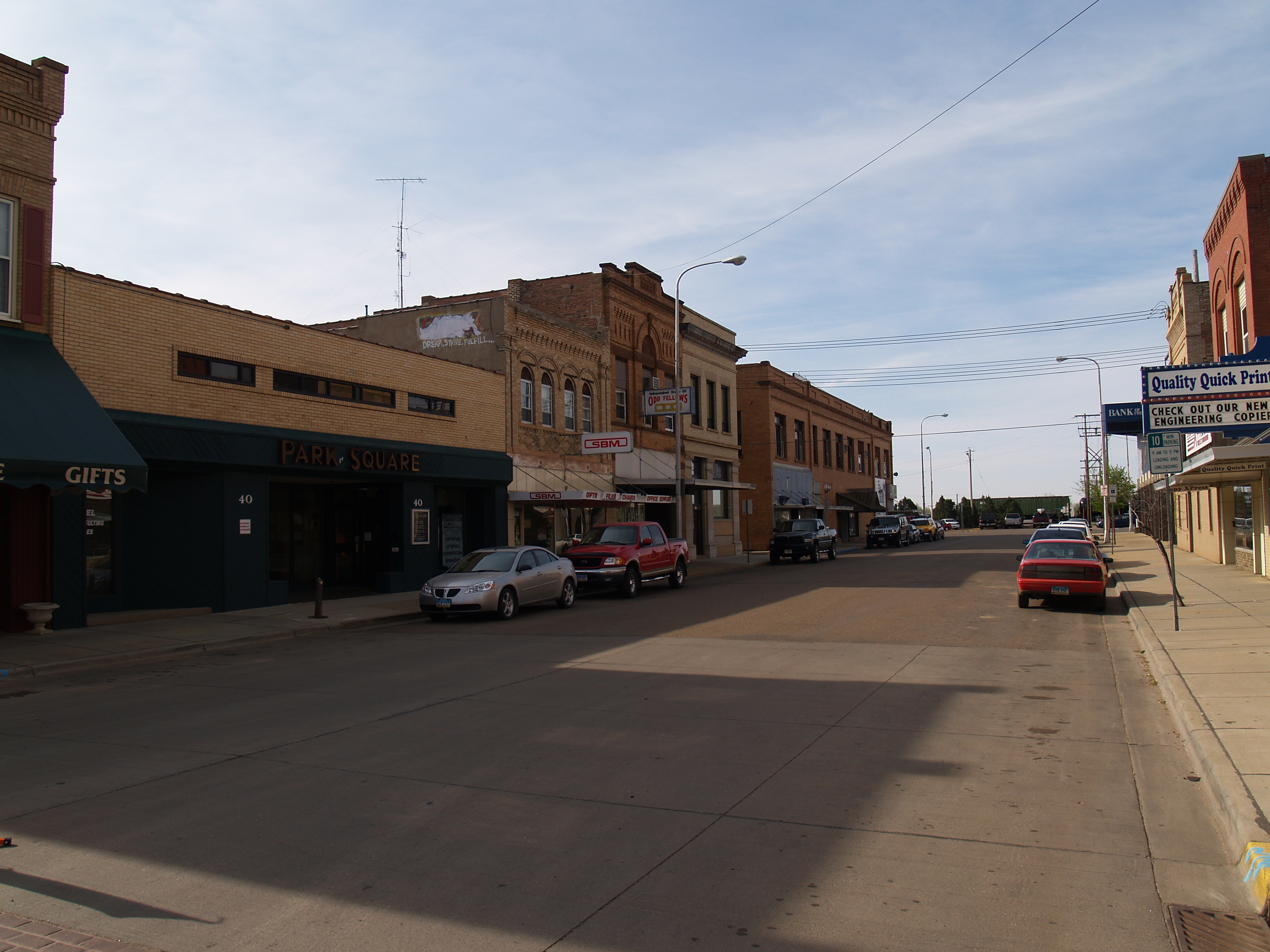
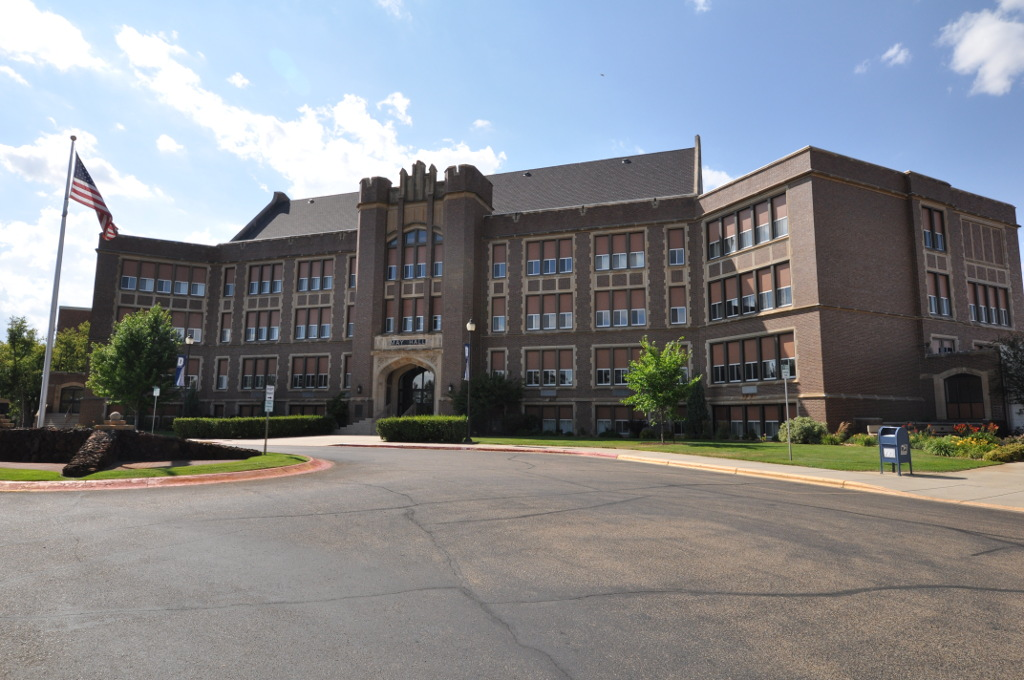
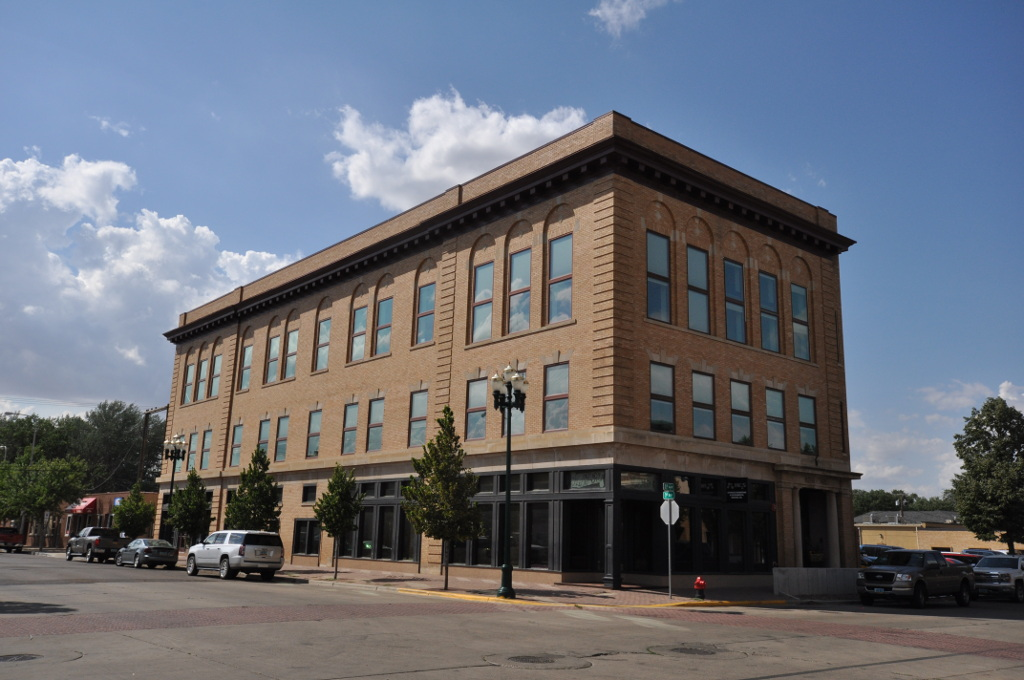
- Downtown Dickinson (2008) Dickinson State Normal School Campus District Elks Club and Store Building–Dickinson Lodge No. 1137

- Logo
- Nickname: Queen City
- Location of Dickinson, North Dakota
- Coordinates: 46°53′01″N 102°47′20″W
- Country: United States
- State: North Dakota
- County: Stark
- Founded: 1881
- Incorporated: May 30, 1883

Government
  - Type: City Commission
  - Mayor: Scott J. Decker
  - Governor: Kelly Armstrong (R)

Area
  - City: 13.267 sq mi (34.361 km^{2})
  - Land: 13.200 sq mi (34.187 km^{2})
  - Water: 0.067 sq mi (0.174 km^{2})
- Elevation: 2,460 ft (750 m)

Population (2020)
  - City: 25,679
  - Estimate (2023): 25,130
  - Density: 1,903.6/sq mi (734.99/km^{2})
  - Urban: 25,674
  - Urban density: 2,095/sq mi (808.7/km^{2})
  - Metro: 38,054
  - Metro density: 8.47/sq mi (3.271/km^{2})
- Time zone: UTC–7 (Mountain (MST))
  - Summer (DST): UTC–6 (MDT)
- ZIP Codes: 58601, 58602
- Area code: 701
- FIPS code: 38-19620
- GNIS feature ID: 1035991
- Sales tax: 6.5%
- Highways: I-94, I-94 Bus., ND 22
- Website: dickinsongov.com

Dickinson is a city in and the county seat of Stark County, North Dakota, United States. The population was 25,679 at the 2020 census, making it the seventh most populous city in North Dakota. Dickinson, founded in 1881, is also home to Dickinson State University.

Since the North Dakota oil boom the city has become one of the fastest-growing cities in the United States. According to the 2020 census, the city is estimated to have a population of 25,679, however, other sources have estimates of the population at 33,646 or possibly exceeding 35,000. Dickinson is home to the Ukrainian Cultural Institute, which has a museum and holds events year-round for the local Ukrainian community.

Dickinson is the principal city of the Dickinson Micropolitan Statistical Area, a micropolitan area that covers Billings and Stark counties and had a combined population of 34,591 at the 2020 census.

== History ==
Dickinson was founded in 1881. Dickinson was named for its founder, W. S. Dickinson, a native of Malone, New York.

In 1924, Dickinson was the site of a tornado that killed nine people, making it the fourth deadliest tornado in North Dakota's recorded history. Dickinson was the site of an EF3 tornado in 2009 that damaged more than 450 homes and businesses, with 100 beyond repair, but with no injuries or casualties.

The rapid growth of the city due to an oil boom led to an increase in crime and homelessness within the city limits in the 2010s.

== Geography ==
According to the United States Census Bureau, the city has a total area of 13.267 square miles (34.36 km^{2}), of which 13.200 square miles (34.19 km^{2}) is land and 0.067 square miles (0.17 km^{2}) is water. Dickinson's municipal water supplies come from Southwest Water Authority which, in turn, gets their water from Lake Sakakawea through a transmission pipeline.

=== Climate ===
Nearly all of Stark County has a humid continental climate of warm summer (Köppen: Dfb), but due to low precipitation and marginality between climate with monsoon-influenced dry winter (Dwb) and semi-arid climate (BSk), Dickinson can be said to be prone to periods of drought, even though it is defined as wet all year round. Its climate is similar to Bismarck's, though a bit less extreme. The monthly daily average temperature ranges from 16.3 °F (−8.7 °C) in January to 69.2 °F (20.7 °C) in July; on average, temperatures reach 100 °F (38 °C) on 2.2 days, 90 °F (32 °C) on 22 days, and 0 °F (−18 °C) on 32 days annually. The average window for freezing temperatures is September 22 thru May 16 and for measurable (≥0.1 inches or 0.25 centimetres) snow, October 26 thru April 19. Due to the relative aridity, there are only 2.8 days where 24-hour snowfall exceeds 3 inches (7.6 cm). With a period of record dating only to 1893, extreme temperatures range from −47 °F (−44 °C) as recently as January 12, 2011 to 114 °F (46 °C) on July 6, 1936.

Climate data for Dickinson Theodore Roosevelt Regional Airport, North Dakota (1991–2020 normals, extremes 1948–present)
Month	Jan	Feb	Mar	Apr	May	Jun	Jul	Aug	Sep	Oct	Nov	Dec	Year
Record high °F (°C)	63 (17)	68 (20)	80 (27)	94 (34)	99 (37)	104 (40)	109 (43)	108 (42)	104 (40)	95 (35)	80 (27)	67 (19)	109 (43)
Mean maximum °F (°C)	49.0 (9.4)	51.8 (11.0)	66.7 (19.3)	78.3 (25.7)	84.9 (29.4)	91.2 (32.9)	97.1 (36.2)	97.9 (36.6)	94.0 (34.4)	81.2 (27.3)	65.3 (18.5)	52.3 (11.3)	100.1 (37.8)
Mean daily maximum °F (°C)	26.6 (−3.0)	30.2 (−1.0)	42.1 (5.6)	54.7 (12.6)	66.1 (18.9)	75.6 (24.2)	83.9 (28.8)	83.7 (28.7)	73.0 (22.8)	56.4 (13.6)	41.3 (5.2)	30.1 (−1.1)	55.3 (12.9)
Daily mean °F (°C)	16.4 (−8.7)	19.6 (−6.9)	30.3 (−0.9)	41.6 (5.3)	52.9 (11.6)	62.5 (16.9)	69.4 (20.8)	68.5 (20.3)	58.5 (14.7)	43.8 (6.6)	30.3 (−0.9)	19.9 (−6.7)	42.8 (6.0)
Mean daily minimum °F (°C)	6.2 (−14.3)	9.0 (−12.8)	18.6 (−7.4)	28.4 (−2.0)	39.7 (4.3)	49.4 (9.7)	55.0 (12.8)	53.2 (11.8)	44.0 (6.7)	31.2 (−0.4)	19.3 (−7.1)	9.7 (−12.4)	30.3 (−0.9)
Mean minimum °F (°C)	−19.4 (−28.6)	−13.7 (−25.4)	−3.9 (−19.9)	11.5 (−11.4)	25.2 (−3.8)	37.7 (3.2)	45.1 (7.3)	41.6 (5.3)	29.6 (−1.3)	13.2 (−10.4)	−0.8 (−18.2)	−14.3 (−25.7)	−24.2 (−31.2)
Record low °F (°C)	−35 (−37)	−35 (−37)	−28 (−33)	−10 (−23)	4 (−16)	30 (−1)	35 (2)	32 (0)	17 (−8)	−7 (−22)	−18 (−28)	−34 (−37)	−35 (−37)
Average precipitation inches (mm)	0.25 (6.4)	0.32 (8.1)	0.56 (14)	1.37 (35)	2.55 (65)	3.05 (77)	2.55 (65)	1.53 (39)	1.62 (41)	1.17 (30)	0.47 (12)	0.19 (4.8)	15.63 (397)
Average snowfall inches (cm)	6.0 (15)	5.0 (13)	5.6 (14)	5.9 (15)	0.5 (1.3)	0.0 (0.0)	0.0 (0.0)	0.0 (0.0)	0.5 (1.3)	1.6 (4.1)	5.8 (15)	4.6 (12)	35.5 (90)
Average precipitation days (≥ 0.01 in)	4.8	4.4	5.9	8.0	11.2	12.5	9.8	6.9	6.6	6.2	4.7	4.0	85.0
Average snowy days (≥ 0.1 in)	5.8	4.8	4.9	3.0	0.3	0.0	0.0	0.0	0.2	1.1	5.1	5.6	30.8
Source: NOAA (snow 1981–2010)

Climate data for Dickinson, North Dakota (1991–2020 normals, extremes 1893–2012)
Month	Jan	Feb	Mar	Apr	May	Jun	Jul	Aug	Sep	Oct	Nov	Dec	Year
Record high °F (°C)	61 (16)	67 (19)	85 (29)	93 (34)	106 (41)	109 (43)	114 (46)	110 (43)	104 (40)	95 (35)	81 (27)	68 (20)	114 (46)
Mean maximum °F (°C)	49.2 (9.6)	53.6 (12.0)	66.6 (19.2)	79.4 (26.3)	86.0 (30.0)	91.9 (33.3)	98.5 (36.9)	97.8 (36.6)	93.7 (34.3)	82.1 (27.8)	66.7 (19.3)	51.1 (10.6)	101.0 (38.3)
Mean daily maximum °F (°C)	26.5 (−3.1)	30.6 (−0.8)	41.4 (5.2)	54.3 (12.4)	65.9 (18.8)	75.2 (24.0)	83.0 (28.3)	83.0 (28.3)	72.5 (22.5)	56.7 (13.7)	41.8 (5.4)	30.3 (−0.9)	55.1 (12.8)
Daily mean °F (°C)	14.6 (−9.7)	18.6 (−7.4)	29.1 (−1.6)	41.2 (5.1)	52.7 (11.5)	62.4 (16.9)	69.1 (20.6)	67.9 (19.9)	57.5 (14.2)	42.9 (6.1)	29.6 (−1.3)	18.4 (−7.6)	42.0 (5.6)
Mean daily minimum °F (°C)	2.8 (−16.2)	6.5 (−14.2)	16.8 (−8.4)	28.1 (−2.2)	39.5 (4.2)	49.6 (9.8)	55.1 (12.8)	52.8 (11.6)	42.5 (5.8)	29.0 (−1.7)	17.4 (−8.1)	6.6 (−14.1)	28.9 (−1.7)
Mean minimum °F (°C)	−22.6 (−30.3)	−17.6 (−27.6)	−6.1 (−21.2)	10.5 (−11.9)	23.6 (−4.7)	35.3 (1.8)	42.3 (5.7)	38.7 (3.7)	24.9 (−3.9)	10.1 (−12.2)	−4.0 (−20.0)	−19.8 (−28.8)	−29.7 (−34.3)
Record low °F (°C)	−47 (−44)	−47 (−44)	−36 (−38)	−16 (−27)	7 (−14)	26 (−3)	29 (−2)	24 (−4)	12 (−11)	−15 (−26)	−29 (−34)	−41 (−41)	−47 (−44)
Average precipitation inches (mm)	0.40 (10)	0.53 (13)	0.68 (17)	1.56 (40)	2.59 (66)	3.17 (81)	2.69 (68)	1.86 (47)	1.73 (44)	1.33 (34)	0.59 (15)	0.43 (11)	17.56 (446)
Average snowfall inches (cm)	4.9 (12)	4.4 (11)	5.8 (15)	4.2 (11)	0.8 (2.0)	0.0 (0.0)	0.0 (0.0)	0.0 (0.0)	0.3 (0.76)	3.0 (7.6)	4.4 (11)	6.5 (17)	34.3 (87)
Average precipitation days (≥ 0.01 in)	6.5	5.6	6.4	7.4	11.4	12.1	9.6	7.4	7.7	6.4	4.8	5.6	90.9
Average snowy days (≥ 0.1 in)	4.1	4.5	3.7	1.5	0.3	0.0	0.0	0.0	0.1	1.0	2.9	5.3	23.4
Source: NOAA (snow, mean maxima/minima 1981–2010)

== Demographics ==
Historical population
Census	Pop.	Note	%±
1890	897		—
1900	2,076		131.4%
1910	3,678		77.2%
1920	4,122		12.1%
1930	5,025		21.9%
1940	5,839		16.2%
1950	7,469		27.9%
1960	9,971		33.5%
1970	12,405		24.4%
1980	15,974		28.8%
1990	16,097		0.8%
2000	16,010		−0.5%
2010	17,787		11.1%
2020	25,679		44.4%
2023 (est.)	25,130		−2.1%
U.S. Decennial Census; 2020 Census

=== Racial and ethnic composition ===
Dickinson, North Dakota – racial and ethnic composition Note: the US Census treats Hispanic/Latino as an ethnic category. This table excludes Latinos from the racial categories and assigns them to a separate category. Hispanics/Latinos may be of any race.
Race / ethnicity (NH = non-Hispanic)	Pop. 2000	Pop. 2010	Pop. 2020	% 2000	% 2010	% 2020
White alone (NH)	15,448	16,542	20,920	96.49%	93.00%	81.47%
Black or African American alone (NH)	39	175	1,004	0.24%	0.98%	3.91%
Native American or Alaska Native alone (NH)	185	208	338	1.16%	1.17%	1.32%
Asian alone (NH)	37	258	310	0.23%	1.45%	1.21%
Pacific Islander alone (NH)	4	7	45	0.02%	0.04%	0.18%
Other race alone (NH)	9	2	75	0.06%	0.01%	0.29%
Mixed race or multiracial (NH)	120	213	923	0.75%	1.20%	3.59%
Hispanic or Latino (any race)	168	382	2,064	1.05%	2.15%	8.04%
Total	16,010	17,787	25,679	100.00%	100.00%	100.00%

=== American Community Survey ===
As of the 2022 American Community Survey, there are 10,247 estimated households in Dickinson with an average of 2.38 persons per household. The city has a median household income of $75,767. Approximately 10.7% of the city's population lives at or below the poverty line. Dickinson has an estimated 69.5% employment rate, with 25.5% of the population holding a bachelor's degree or higher and 91.2% holding a high school diploma. The median age in the city was 33.1 years.

=== Ancestry ===
The top nine reported ancestries (people were allowed to report up to two ancestries, thus the figures will generally add to more than 100%) were German (38.3%), Norwegian (11.2%), Irish (7.2%), English (5.7%), French (except Basque) (2.3%), Italian (2.0%), Polish (1.0%), Scottish (1.0%), and Subsaharan African (0.3%).

=== 2020 census ===
As of the 2020 census, there were 25,679 people, 10,544 households, and 6,193 families residing in the city. The population density was 1,816.6 inhabitants per square mile (701.4/km^{2}). There were 11,953 housing units at an average density of 845.6 inhabitants per square mile (326.5/km^{2}); 11.8% of housing units were vacant, with a homeowner vacancy rate of 2.0% and a rental vacancy rate of 15.7%.

Of these households, 31.6% had children under the age of 18 living in them. Of all households, 43.7% were married-couple households, 24.7% were households with a male householder and no spouse or partner present, and 22.7% were households with a female householder and no spouse or partner present. About 33.0% of all households were made up of individuals and 8.9% had someone living alone who was 65 years of age or older.

The median age was 32.8 years. 25.6% of residents were under the age of 18 and 12.2% were 65 years of age or older. For every 100 females there were 106.9 males, and for every 100 females age 18 and over there were 106.4 males age 18 and over.

98.5% of residents lived in urban areas, while 1.5% lived in rural areas.

Racial composition as of the 2020 census
Race	Number	Percent
White	21,478	83.6%
Black or African American	1,020	4.0%
American Indian and Alaska Native	407	1.6%
Asian	319	1.2%
Native Hawaiian and Other Pacific Islander	50	0.2%
Some other race	845	3.3%
Two or more races	1,560	6.1%
Hispanic or Latino (of any race)	2,064	8.0%

=== 2010 census ===
As of the 2010 census, there were 17,787 people, 7,521 households, and 4,308 families residing in the city. The population density was 1,785.4 inhabitants per square mile (689.3/km^{2}). There were 7,865 housing units at an average density of 789.7 inhabitants per square mile (304.9/km^{2}). The racial makeup of the city was 94.16% White, 1.05% African American, 1.22% Native American, 1.47% Asian, 0.05% Pacific Islander, 0.56% from some other races, and 1.50% from two or more races. Hispanic or Latino people of any race were 2.15% of the population.

There were 7,521 households, of which 26.6% had children under the age of 18 living with them, 45.4% were married couples living together, 8.1% had a female householder with no husband present, 3.9% had a male householder with no wife present, and 42.7% were non-families. 33.6% of all households were made up of individuals, and 12.8% had someone living alone who was 65 years of age or older. The average household size was 2.25 and the average family size was 2.89.

The median age in the city was 35.6 years. 21% of residents were under the age of 18; 14.1% were between the ages of 18 and 24; 24.6% were from 25 to 44; 24.3% were from 45 to 64; and 16.1% were 65 years of age or older. The gender makeup of the city was 49.3% male and 50.7% female.

=== 2000 census ===
As of the 2000 census, there were 16,010 people, 6,517 households, and 4,020 families residing in the city. The population density was 1,690.7 inhabitants per square mile (652.8/km^{2}). There were 7,033 housing units at an average density of 742.7 inhabitants per square mile (286.8/km^{2}). The racial makeup of the city was 97.16% White, 0.27% African American, 1.20% Native American, 0.24% Asian, 0.03% Pacific Islander, 0.32% from some other races, and 0.77% from two or more races. Hispanic or Latino people of any race were 1.05% of the population.

The top six ancestry groups in the city are German (54.1%), Norwegian (14.2%), Czech (7.5%), Russian (7.2%), Irish (5.5%), English (3.7%).

There were 6,517 households, out of which 30.9% had children under the age of 18 living with them, 49.7% were married couples living together, 9.1% had a female householder with no husband present, and 38.3% were non-families. 32.4% of all households were made up of individuals, and 13.3% had someone living alone who was 65 years of age or older. The average household size was 2.33 and the average family size was 2.99.

In the city, the population was spread out, with 24.5% under the age of 18, 13.8% from 18 to 24, 25.9% from 25 to 44, 19.8% from 45 to 64, and 16.1% who were 65 years of age or older. The median age was 36 years. For every 100 females, there were 93.5 males. For every 100 females age 18 and over, there were 88.7 males.

The median income for a household in the city was $31,542, and the median income for a family was $41,566. Males had a median income of $30,613 versus $19,951 for females. The per capita income for the city was $15,975. About 7.1% of families and 12.0% of the population were below the poverty line, including 10.2% of those under age 18 and 16.9% of those age 65 or over.

== Education ==
=== K–12 ===
The Dickinson Public Schools system includes six elementary schools, a junior high school, Dickinson High School and an alternative high school. There are also several parochial schools in Dickinson. Trinity East, Trinity North, Trinity Central, and Trinity West serve as the parochial elementary schools and Dickinson Trinity has both a junior high school and a high school. Hope Christian Academy is also located in Dickinson. HCA is part of the Evangelical Bible Church. The current principal is Shane Bradley.

=== Higher education ===
Dickinson is home to Dickinson State University.

== Law enforcement ==
Dickinson Police Department
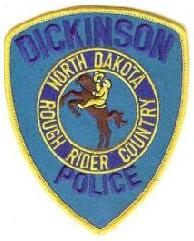
- Dickinson Police Department patch

Agency overview
- Preceding agency: Dickinson Police Department
- Employees: 74.5

Jurisdictional structure
- Operations jurisdiction: Stark County, North Dakota, United States
- General nature: Civilian police

Operational structure
- Headquarters: 2475 State Ave North Dickinson, ND 58601
- Police Officers: 32 (2024)
- Professional Staffs: 24 (2022)
- Agency executive: Joe Cianni, Chief of Police

Facilities
- Detention Centers: 1
- Marked and Unmarked Cars: 20
- K-9 Units: 2

Website
- Dickinson Police Department web site

The Dickinson Police Department employs about 50 full-time sworn police officers and 24 full-time civilian employees, including dispatchers, records staff and animal control.

== Media ==
=== Print ===
- The Dickinson Press

=== Television ===
- 2.1 KXMA-TV (The CW)
- 7.1 KQCD-TV (NBC, with Fox on 7.2)
- 9.1 KDSE (PBS via Prairie Public Television)
- In addition, Bismarck ABC affiliate KBMY is available only on local satellite and cable systems; it was previously simulcast via KXMA-TV on 2.2 until February 2, 2016. CBS was previously on KXMA-DT2 until August 2026.

=== Radio ===
FM band

- 88.1 K201FN – rebroadcasts CSN (Christian)
- 89.9 KDPR – North Dakota Public Radio/NPR network (Public radio)
- 90.7 KSLS – rebroadcasts KSLT "K-Salt" (Cont. Christian music)
- 92.1 KZRX "Z92" (Mainstream Rock)
- 93.9 KXDI "I94" (Country)
- 95.7 KQLZ "Q-Rock 95" (Classic Rock)
- 99.1 KCAD "Roughrider Country" (Country)
- 103.3 KPAR-LP – low power broadcaster carrying LifeTalk Radio network (Christian Talk)
- 105.7 KDXN "The Mix" (Adult Contemporary)

AM band

- 1230 KDIX "Classic Hits" (Oldies/Classic Hits)
- 1340 KPOK (Country/Talk)
- 1410 KDKT "Fox Sports Radio 1410" (Sports/Talk)
- 1460 KLTC (Classic country/Talk)

== Transportation ==
Intercity bus service to the city is provided by Jefferson Lines. Local dial-a-ride transit is provided by Dickinson Public Transit for a $4 fare. Hours of operation are from 6:00am–6:00pm Monday-Saturday, and 9:00am–6:00pm on Sunday.

Dickinson is located at the intersection of ND 22 and Interstate 94, about 20 miles east of US 85. It is located around 30 miles east of Medora and Theodore Roosevelt National Park.

Dickinson Theodore Roosevelt Regional Airport has flights to Denver via United Airlines.

== Sites of interest ==
DJ's Bar, Dickinson, 1987

- Badlands Dinosaur Museum
- Dickinson Museum Center
- Dakota Community Bank & Trust Ballpark
- Dickinson Area Public Library (originally a Carnegie Library)
- Sanford Sports Complex
- North Dakota Soccer Association headquarters
- Henry Biesiot Activities Center
- West River Ice Center
- West River Community Center

== Sports ==
- The Dickinson Packers played independent minor league baseball in the Mandak League from 1955 to 1956
- Dickinson State University Blue Hawks
- Dickinson High School Mavericks
- Dickinson Roughriders (baseball)
- Dickinson Outlaws (hockey)
- Dickinson Trinity High School Titans
- Badlands Big Sticks, summer collegiate baseball team in the Northwoods League

== Notable people ==
- Kelly Armstrong, born in Dickinson, 34th Governor of North Dakota, former member of the U.S. House of Representatives
- LaRoy Baird, lived in Dickinson, former member of North Dakota Senate
- Doug Beaudoin, born in Dickinson, former American football safety in the NFL
- Bob Bergloff, born in Dickinson, former ice hockey defenseman
- Henry Biesiot, former coach of the American football DSU Blue Hawks, stadium named Henry Biesiot Activities Center after him.
- Byron Dorgan, born in Dickinson, former United States Senator
- Edward Doro, born in Dickinson, poet
- Clay S. Jenkinson, born in Dickinson, scholar, author, and educator
- Bennie Joppru, born in Dickinson, former tight end in the National Football League
- Douglas Kary, born in Dickinson, member of the Montana Legislature
- Aaron Krauter, born in Dickinson, member of North Dakota Senate
- Jake Kubas, born in Dickinson, current NFL guard for the New York Giants
- John S. Lesmeister, born in Dickinson, 30th North Dakota State Treasurer
- Kellan Lutz, born in Dickinson, actor, played Emmett Cullen in Twilight
- Mitch Malloy, born in Dickinson, singer and songwriter
- Ted Nace, raised in Dickinson, writer, publisher, and environmentalist
- Herb Parker (1921–2007), lived in Dickinson, teacher and American football coach at Minot State University
- Malachi Ritscher (1954–2006), born in Dickinson, musician and human rights activist
- George Scherger (1920–2011), born in Dickinson, MLB coach, infielder, and manager
- Dorothy Stickney (1896–1998), born in Dickinson, stage and film actress, auditorium at May Hall at Dickinson State University named after her
- Bill Swain, born in Dickinson, former linebacker for the New York Giants
