= Grand Forks Channel Cats =

Collegiate summer baseball team in North Dakota

Information
- League: Northwoods League (1998-2000)
- Location: Grand Forks, North Dakota
- Ballpark: Kraft Memorial Field
- Founded: 1998
- Colors: Green, black, gray, blue, white

The Grand Forks Channel Cats were an American baseball team that played in the Northwoods League, a collegiate summer baseball league. They played their home games at Kraft Memorial Field in Grand Forks, North Dakota.

== History ==
The city of Grand Forks had previously had an independent baseball team called the Grand Forks Varmints, who played in the Prairie League in 1996 and 1997. The Prairie League folded after that season, and Grand Forks was one of three former Prairie League markets that entered the Northwoods League in 1998. While the Southern Minny Stars kept their branding, the Brainerd Mighty Gulls and Channel Cats established new identities.

The Channel Cats played three seasons in the Northwoods League, posting records of 26–38, 19–44, and 18–43. After the 2000 season, the Channel Cats ceased operations.

== Channel Cats in MLB ==
The following is a list of former Channel Cats to appear in Major League Baseball.

| Name | Year with Channel Cats | MLB Debut |
|---|---|---|
| Jordan De Jong | 1998 | 2007 (Toronto Blue Jays) |
