= Charles McAdoo =

American baseball player (born 2002)

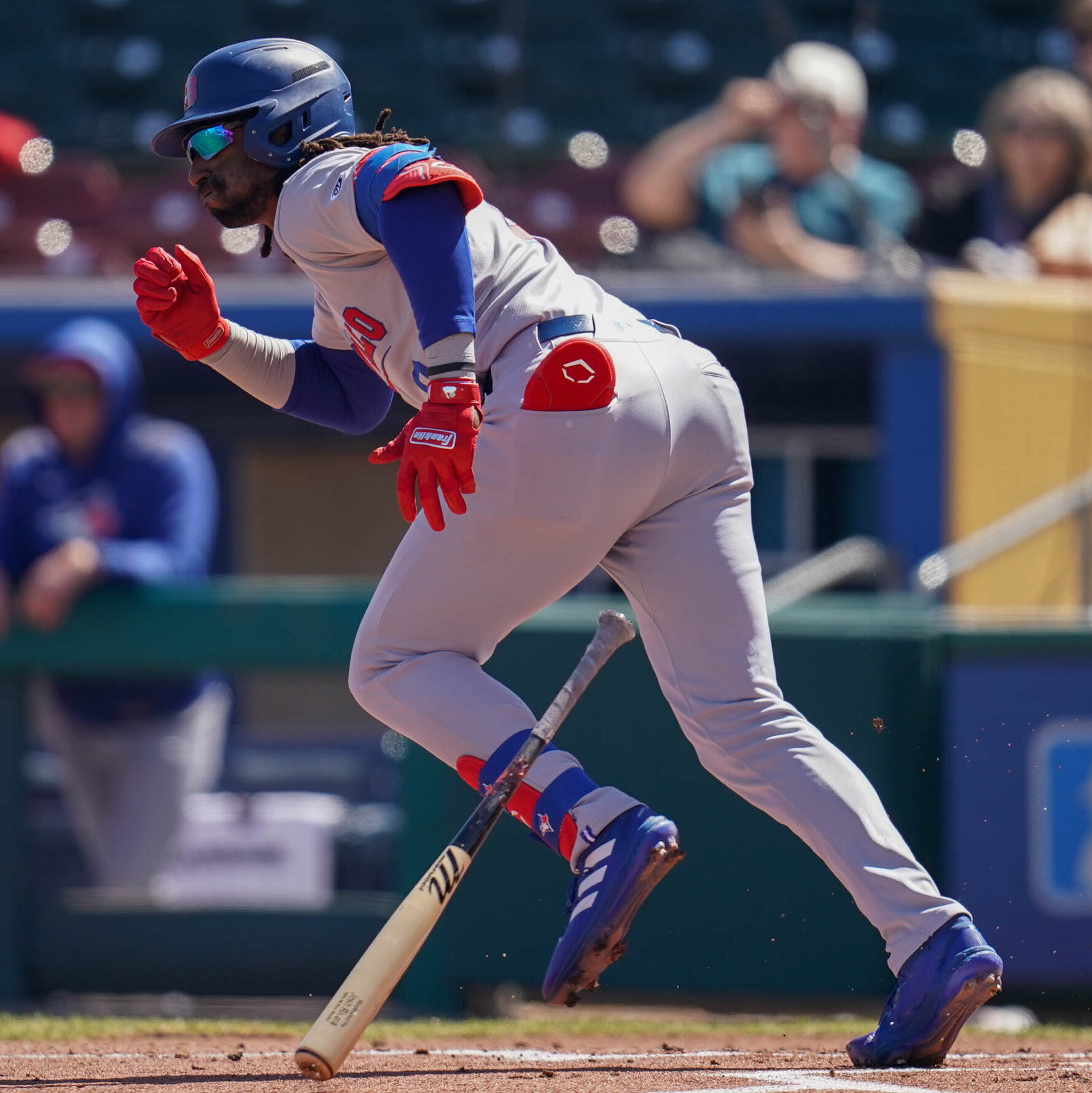
- McAdoo with the Buffalo Bisons in 2026

Toronto Blue Jays – No. 26
- Infielder
- Born: March 6, 2002 (age 24); Walnut Creek, California, U.S.
- Bats: Right Throws: Right

MLB debut
- May 29, 2026, for the Toronto Blue Jays

MLB statistics (through 2026 season)
- Batting average: .258
- Home runs: 3
- Runs batted in: 14
- Stats at Baseball Reference

Teams
- Toronto Blue Jays (2026–present)

Charles Alexander McAdoo (born March 6, 2002) is an American professional baseball infielder for the Toronto Blue Jays of Major League Baseball (MLB). He made his MLB debut in 2026.

== Amateur career ==
McAdoo attended De La Salle High School in Concord, California and played college baseball at the San Jose State University. In three seasons with the Spartans, McAdoo recorded a .325 batting average, 24 home runs, and 119 runs batted in (RBI). During the summer, McAdoo played for the Spearfish Sasquatch of the Expedition League and the Mankato MoonDogs of the Northwoods League.

== Professional career ==
=== Pittsburgh Pirates ===
McAdoo was selected by the Pittsburgh Pirates in the 13th round of the 2023 Major League Baseball draft. He signed with the Pirates, and made his professional debut with the Low-A Bradenton Marauders. He started 2024 with the High-A Greensboro Grasshoppers, and was later promoted to the Double-A Altoona Curve.

=== Toronto Blue Jays ===
On July 30, 2024, the Pirates traded McAdoo to the Toronto Blue Jays in exchange for Isiah Kiner-Falefa. He was assigned to the Double-A New Hampshire Fisher Cats for the remainder of the 2024 season. In 124 combined games, McAdoo hit .279 with 17 home runs, 79 RBI, and 21 stolen bases. He remained with New Hampshire for the entire 2025 season, batting .247 with 16 home runs, 45 RBI, and 34 stolen bases.

McAdoo began the 2026 campaign with the Triple-A Buffalo Bisons. On May 28, 2026, McAdoo was promoted to the major leagues for the first time. To that point in the season, he had appeared in 49 games with Buffalo and was hitting .250 with eight home runs and 27 RBI. McAdoo debuted the following night against the Baltimore Orioles, and in his first career hit, knocked a two-run home run off Orioles' starter Trevor Rogers in a 6–5 win for the Blue Jays.
