= Minot Greenheads =

Collegiate summer baseball team in North Dakota

Information
- League: Northwoods League (2000)
- Location: Minot, North Dakota
- Ballpark: Corbett Field
- Founded: 2000
- Colors: Green, blue, gold, white

The Minot Greenheads were an American baseball team that played in the Northwoods League, a collegiate summer baseball league. They played their home games at Corbett Field in Minot, North Dakota.

== History ==
The Greenheads came into being after the 1999 Northwoods League season, when the Southern Minny Stars relocated due to economic problems. Corbett Field had previously hosted a Prairie League team called the Minot Mallards, which itself shared a name with previous affiliated minor league baseball teams. The Greenheads name and identity similarly referred to mallard ducks. The league's expansion to Minot increased travel distances to a point where every NWL club traveled by coach bus for the first time.

The Greenheads only played one season in the NWL before ceasing operations. They posted a record of 22-42 and did not have a single player go on to reach Major League Baseball.
