= Brainerd Mighty Gulls =

Collegiate summer baseball team in Minnesota

Information
- League: Northwoods League (1998–2002)
- Location: Brainerd, Minnesota
- Ballpark: Stewart C. Mills Field
- Founded: 1998
- Colors: Blue, gold, white

The Brainerd Mighty Gulls were an American baseball team that played in the Northwoods League, a collegiate summer baseball league. They played their home games at Stewart C. Mills Field in Brainerd, Minnesota

== History ==
The city of Brainerd had previously had an independent baseball team called the Bobcats, who played in the Prairie League in 1997. The Prairie League folded after that season, and Brainerd was one of three former Prairie League markets that entered the Northwoods League in 1998. While the Southern Minny Stars kept their branding, the Grand Forks Channel Cats and Mighty Gulls established new identities.

The Mighty Gulls played five seasons in the Northwoods League. While they never won a league championship, they finished as runner-up in their final season of 2002, falling to the Waterloo Bucks in the championship series. After the 2002 season, the Mighty Gulls ceased operations.

== Mighty Gulls in MLB ==
The following is a list of former Mighty Gulls to appear in Major League Baseball.

Name	Year(s) with Mighty Gulls	MLB Debut
T.J. Bohn	2001	2006 (Seattle Mariners)
Mike Burns	1998–99	2005 (Houston Astros)
Jordan De Jong	1999	2007 (Toronto Blue Jays)
Mike McCoy	2000	2009 (Colorado Rockies)
Mike Rouse	1999–2000	2006 (Oakland Athletics)
