= Corbett Field (Minot) =

Baseball park in Minot, North Dakota, US

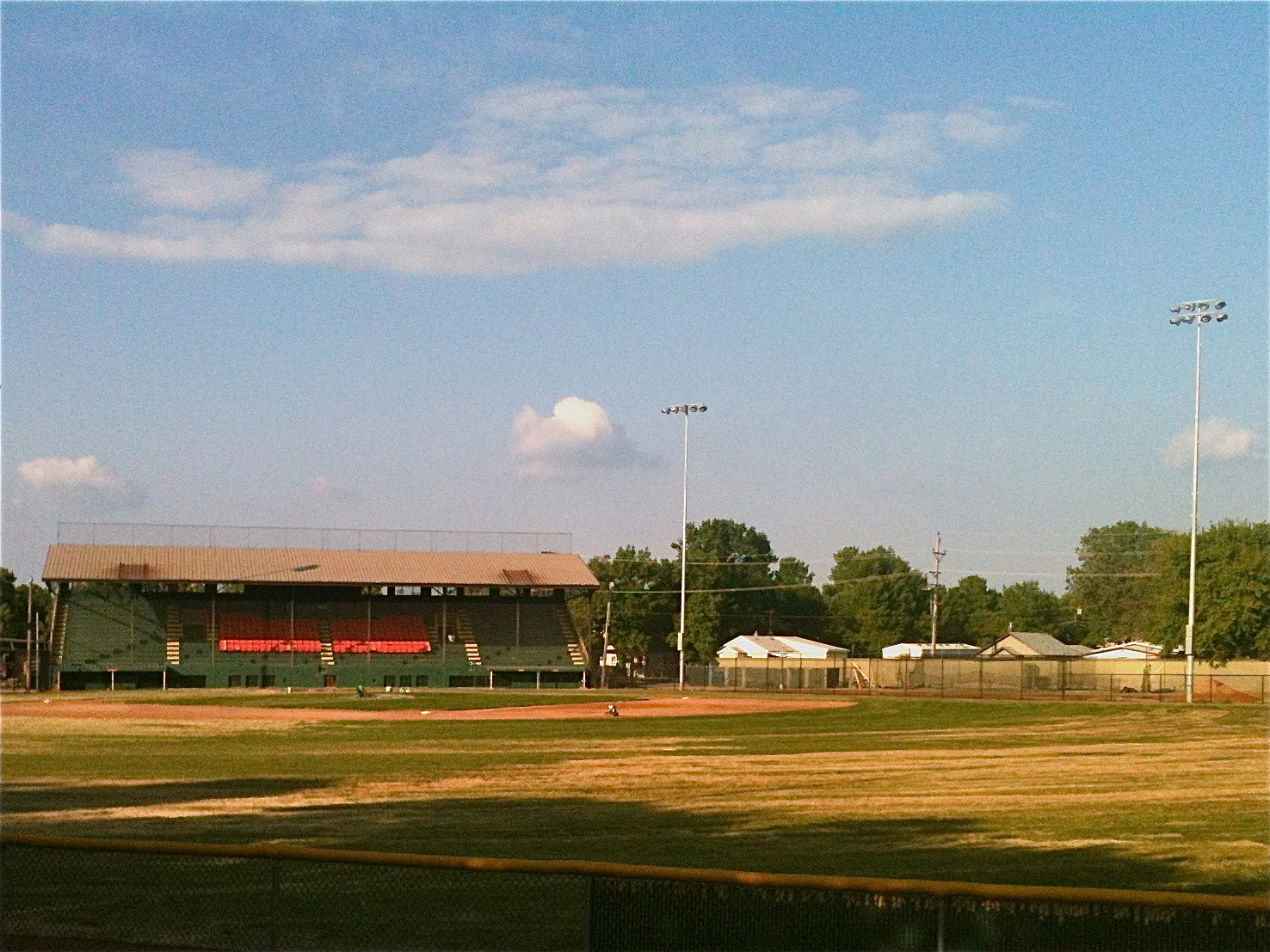
- View from center field in May 2012

- Location in the United States Location in North Dakota
- Interactive map of Corbett Field
- Former names: Minot Municipal Ballpark
- Address: 13th Street SE and E. Burdick Expressway
- Location: Minot, North Dakota, U.S.
- Coordinates: 48°13′54″N 101°16′31″W
- Owner: Minot Park District
- Capacity: 1,266
- Surface: FieldTurf (2018–present); Natural grass (1937–2017)
- Field size: Left field: 310 ft (94 m); Center field': 400 ft (120 m); Right field: 310 ft (94 m)
- Public transit: Minot City Transit

Construction
- Groundbreaking: 1935
- Built: 1935–1937
- Opened: 1937; 89 years ago
- Renovated: 1947 (roof, field lights)
- Architect: Ira Rush

Tenants
- Minot Mallards (MDL) 1950–1957; Minot Mallards (NL) 1958–1960, 1962; Minot Mallards (PL) 1995–1997; Minot Greenheads (NWL) 2000; Souris Valley Sabre Dogs (EL) 2018–2022; Minot Hot Tots (NWL) 2023–present Minot State Beavers (NCAA); Minot High School Magicians (NDHSAA); Bishop Ryan High School Lions (NDHSAA); Minot Metros and Minot Vistas (American Legion)

Corbett Field (formerly Minot Municipal Ballpark) is a baseball park in Minot, North Dakota. Located east of downtown and south of the Roosevelt Park Zoo, it was designed by Minot architect Ira Rush and built between 1935 and 1937 through the Federal Emergency Relief Administration. The Minot Park Board began improvements on the ballpark in 1947, including a roof on the grandstand and field lights. It was named after local dentist Victor Corbett, the president of the park board during that time.

The field is aligned southwest (home plate to center field) at an elevation of 1,550 feet (470 m) above sea level. Natural grass for over eight decades, FieldTurf was installed in the fall of 2017. The teams' dugouts are behind home plate in the base of the grandstand, rather than along the foul lines. The orange seats that were later added to the grandstand were purchased from the old Atlanta–Fulton County Stadium in Georgia. The parking lot is located on the northeast corner of the property, along Burdick Expressway.

The Minot Mallards, a team playing in the integrated Manitoba-Dakota League or Mandak League, began playing at Corbett Field in May 1950. The name "Mallards" was an entry submitted by Minot native Bonnie Rae Miller in a fan-naming contest, beating out "Kernels" and "Plainsmen". In the summer of 1950, Satchel Paige pitched three games for the Mallards. After the league folded, the Mallards continued to play at the ballpark in the 1960s for the Northern League. In 1995, a newly-revived Minot Mallards began playing at the park in the Prairie League, but the league soon folded in 1997. After the 1999 season, the Southern Minny Stars of the Northwoods League moved to Minot and played as the Minot Greenheads. After one season at Corbett in 2000, the Greenheads ceased operations.

Today, the Minot State Beavers, Bishop Ryan Lions, and Minot High Magicians play their games at the field in the spring. In the summer, it is the home of the Minot Metros, a youth team, and the American Legion Class A Minot Vistas.

Since 2023, the Minot Hot Tots of the Northwoods League have played collegiate summer baseball at Corbett Field.
