= Aberdeen Pheasants (Prairie League) =

- 1995–1997; Aberdeen, South Dakota

Minor league affiliations
- Class: Independent (1995–1997)
- League: Prairie League (1995–1997)

Minor league titles
- League titles: none

Team data
- Name: Aberdeen Pheasants (1995–1997)
- Mascot: Flash
- Ballpark: Fossum Field (1995–1997)

The Aberdeen Pheasants were a professional baseball team that played in the Prairie League from 1995 to 1997. They were based in Aberdeen, South Dakota and played their home games at Fossum Field.

== History ==
Aberdeen had a team in the Northern League for its entire post-WW2 runtime, also named the Aberdeen Pheasants, but the league folded after the 1971 season and Aberdeen was left without professional baseball. The new Northern League and the North Central League both contacted Aberdeen about a franchise, but were told that Fossum Field was not up to professional standards.

In 1994, Aberdeen joined the Prairie League, a new independent baseball league, for their 1995 season. The city spent $130,000 on improvements on Fossum Field, replacing the chain link fence with a wooden one and building an entirely new clubhouse. The team's mascot was planned to be a hunting dog, but instead the team adopted a season ticket holder who came to games wearing a mask and costume as their mascot.

1958 MLB Cy Young Award winner and 1949 Aberdeen Pheasant Bob Turley threw out of the first pitch of the Pheasants' first home game. Over the 1995 season, the Pheasants went 56–13 and set the record for highest minor league short-season winning percentage at .812. However, they lost the best-of-five league championship series to the Regina Cyclones.

In July 1997, Aberdeen was kicked from the league for nonpayment of dues, but the next day the owners of the United States-based teams in the league forced the league president, Dave Ferguson, to readmit the Pheasants by threatening to stop playing the Canadian-based teams of the league. Jim Swanson, general manager of the Grand Forks Varmints, described the situation as "We basically put a gun to his [Dave Ferguson's] head, and told him to either use it, or we'd blow it off".

After the 1997 season, the Pheasants folded along with the rest of the Prairie League.

== Seasons ==
Year	League	Division	W–L	Win %	Place	Manager	Postseason	Attendance	Source
Aberdeen Pheasants
1995	Prairie League	American	56–13	.812	1st	Bob Flori	Lost finals 3–1 vs Regina	40,036	
1996	Prairie League	South	52–26	.667	1st	Bob Flori	Lost 1st round 2–0 vs Minot	29,552	
1997	Prairie League	Southern	27–43	.386	4th	Mike Flori	-	32,748	
Totals			135-82	.622				102,336	
