= Ransom County Courthouse =

- U.S. National Register of Historic Places
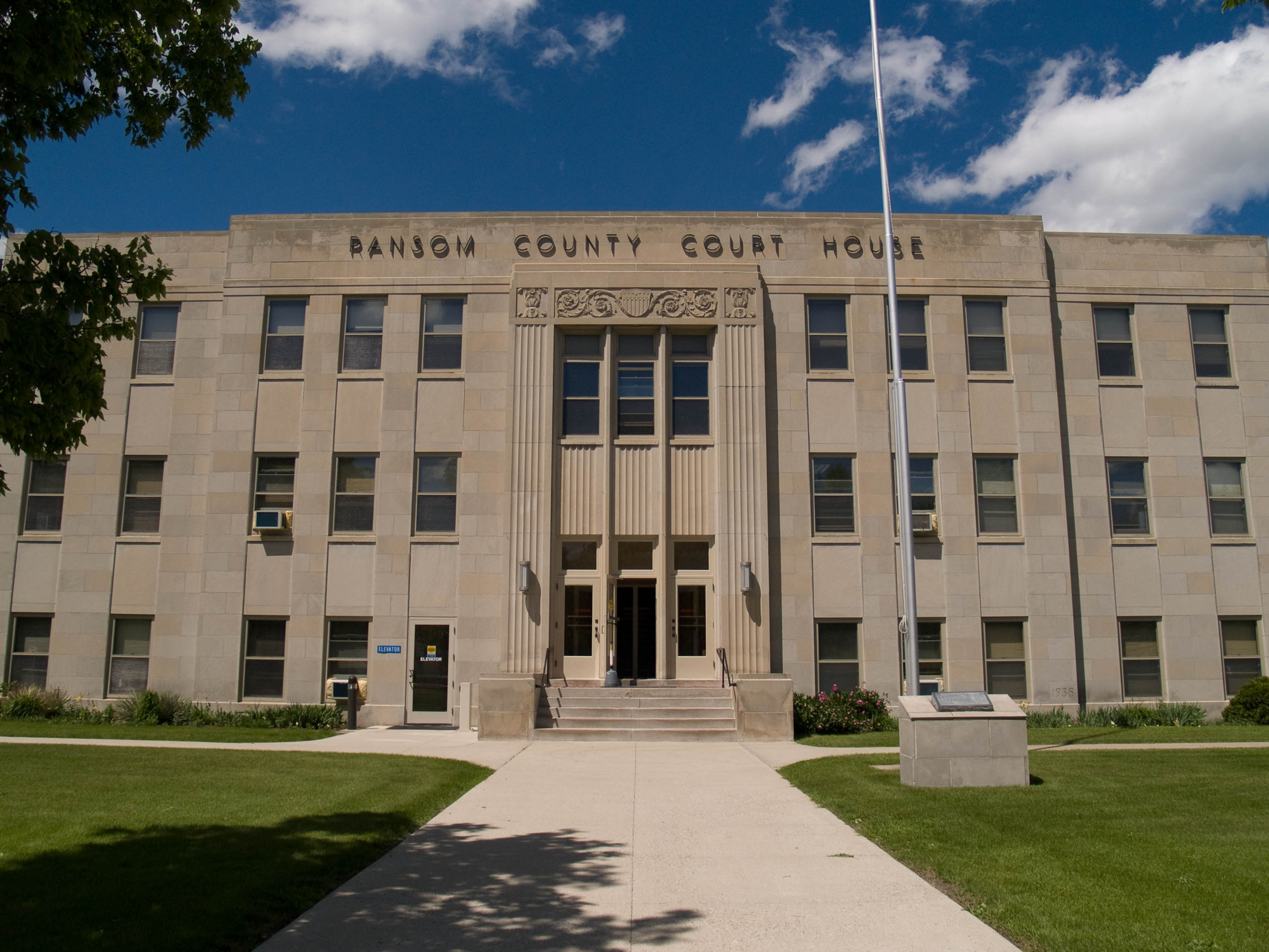
- Ransom County Courthouse in 2008

- Location within North Dakota Location within the United States
- Interactive map showing the location of Ransom County Courthouse
- Location: Fifth Ave. W, Lisbon, North Dakota
- Coordinates: 46°26′32″N 97°41′4″W
- Area: less than one acre
- Built: 1937
- Architect: Rush, Ira
- Architectural style: Art Deco
- MPS: North Dakota County Courthouses TR
- NRHP reference No.: 85002988
- Added to NRHP: November 25, 1985

The Ransom County Courthouse in Lisbon, North Dakota was designed in the Art Deco style by architect Ira Rush. It was built in 1937 and was listed on the U.S. National Register of Historic Places in 1985. Ira Rush designed several courthouses in North Dakota in the Art Deco style; other examples include the Sheridan County Courthouse and Burleigh County Courthouse.

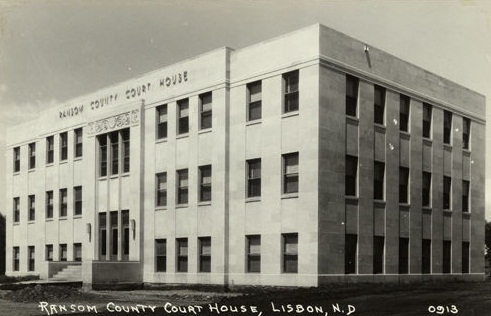
Ransom County Courthouse, c. 1938-1940
