= Brainerd Lakes Area Lunkers =

Baseball team

- 2005–2011; Brainerd, Minnesota

Minor league affiliations
- League: Northwoods League
- Division: North Division

Team data
- Name: Brainerd Lakes Area Lunkers (2009-2011)
- Previous names: Brainerd Blue Thunder (2005-2008)
- Colors: Blue, orange, white, black, light blue
- Ballpark: Mills Field
- Owner/ Operator: Joel Sutherland
- General manager: Dustin Anaas
- Manager: Ryan Levendoski
- Media: Brainerd Dispatch

The Brainerd Lakes Area Lunkers were a baseball team that played in the Northwoods League, a collegiate summer baseball league. Their home games were played at Mills Field in Brainerd, Minnesota.

== History ==
The Lunkers were not the first Northwoods League team to play in Brainerd. From 1998 to 2002, the Brainerd Mighty Gulls played in Brainerd. The Gulls folded after the 2002 season and the new Brainerd franchise entered the league as an expansion team in 2005, calling themselves the Brainerd Blue Thunder. After the 2008 season, the Northwoods League announced that St. Cloud River Bats Owner Joel Sutherland had purchased the Brainerd Blue Thunder.

On January 22, 2009, the Lunkers announced their new name, logo and blue and orange color scheme. The term “lunker”, which is commonly used to describe a game fish that is large for its kind, was submitted twice out of the more than 800 entries in Brainerd’s name-the-team contest.

On the morning of December 19, 2011, the day the 2012 Northwoods League schedule was to be released, the league announced that the Lunkers had folded, citing low attendance. The Lunkers were last in the league in attendance each year from 2009 to 2011, averaging 555, 515, and 528 fans, respectively.

== Notable alumni ==
The following is a list of former Blue Thunder and Lunkers players to appear in Major League Baseball.

| Name | Years with Brainerd | MLB Debut |
|---|---|---|
| Nick Anderson | 2010 | 2019 (Miami Marlins) |
| Ray Black | 2011 | 2018 (San Francisco Giants) |
| Steven Brault | 2011 | 2016 (Pittsburgh Pirates) |
| Hiram Burgos | 2006 | 2013 (Milwaukee Brewers) |
| Andy Dirks | 2006, 2007 | 2011 (Detroit Tigers) |
| Greg Garcia | 2008 | 2014 (St. Louis Cardinals) |
| Dillon Gee | 2005 | 2010 (New York Mets) |
| Joe Harvey | 2011 | 2019 (New York Yankees) |
| Jerad Head | 2005 | 2011 (Cleveland Indians) |
| Eric Komatsu | 2006, 2007 | 2012 (St. Louis Cardinals) |
| Sam LeCure | 2005 | 2010 (Cincinnati Reds) |
| Xavier Scruggs | 2007 | 2014 (St. Louis Cardinals) |
