= Badlands Big Sticks =

American baseball team

- Logo

Information
- League: Northwoods League (Great Plains West [2024–present]))
- Location: Dickinson, North Dakota
- Ballpark: Dakota Community Bank & Trust Ballpark
- Founded: 2017
- Division championships: 3 (2018, 2019, 2020)
- League championships: 1 (2019)
- Former league(s): Independence League Baseball (2022–23); Expedition League (2018–21)
- Colors: Navy, red, white, brown, cream
- Ownership: Dave Ouellette
- Manager: Kelby Coburn
- Website: badlandsbigsticks.com

The Badlands Big Sticks are a collegiate summer baseball team that plays in the Northwoods League. Based in Dickinson, North Dakota, the Big Sticks play their home games at Dakota Community Bank & Trust Ballpark.

== History ==
The Big Sticks were founded in 2017 as a charter member of the Expedition League, beginning play in its inaugural 2018 season. The Big Sticks brand references 26th president of the United States Theodore Roosevelt's strong connection to the Badlands, developing his love for the Western outdoors there and inspiring his lifelong efforts towards conservation, becoming the namesake of the Badlands' Theodore Roosevelt National Park; the nickname references Roosevelt's famous quote, "Speak softly, and carry a big stick."

The Big Sticks enjoyed a solid run in the Expedition League, winning three division titles and the 2019 Expedition League Championship. Following the 2021 season, the Big Sticks joined six other teams in leaving the Expedition League to help form the new Independence League Baseball. While the Big Sticks continued to play solid baseball, they were unable to reach the heights of their early glory days in the ILB.

On October 10, 2023, the Big Sticks announced that they were joining the Northwoods League for the 2024 season.

=== Rivalries ===
The Big Sticks compete with their in-state rivals the Bismarck Larks for the Railroad to Roosevelt Trophy, awarded annually to the winner of the season series between the two teams.

In addition, they compete with their fellow in-state rivals the Minot Hot Tots for the Battle of the Badlands Trophy, also awarded to the winner of the season series between both teams.

== Northwoods League All-Stars ==
The following Big Sticks have been selected to either the Northwoods League mid-season All-Star Game and/or the full-season All-Star Team.

Player	Position	College	Season	Mid-season or full-season
Kaden Carpenter	OF	Utah	2024	Both
Tyler Conklin	P	Eastern Illinois	2024	Both
Sam Nitzke	P	Angelina	2024	Mid-season
Chayton Fischer	C	UT-Rio Grande Valley	2025	Mid-season
Troy Berg	INF	Augustana	2025	Mid-season
Connor Massimini	OF	East Texas Baptist	2025	Mid-season
Ismael Quintero	P	Cal State Los Angeles	2025	Mid-season
Kasen McCawley	P	UNC Pembroke	2025	Mid-season
Chayton Fischer	C	UT-Rio Grande Valley	2026	Mid-season
Jalen Evans	INF	Kansas State	2026	Mid-season
