= Aberdeen Pheasants =

- 1946–1971; Aberdeen, South Dakota

Minor league affiliations
- Class: Class A-Short Season (1965–1971); Class A (1963–1964); Class C (1946–1962)
- League: Northern League (1946–1971)

Major league affiliations
- Team: Baltimore Orioles (1954–1971); St. Louis Browns (1946–1953)

Minor league titles
- League titles (3): 1949; 1961; 1964

Team data
- Name: Aberdeen Pheasants (1946–1971)
- Mascot: Philbert the Pheasant
- Ballpark: Municipal Stadium

The Aberdeen Pheasants were a minor league baseball team based in Aberdeen, South Dakota that played in the Northern League from 1946 until 1971. For their entire existence, the Pheasants were an affiliate of the St. Louis Browns/Baltimore Orioles franchise. They played their home games at Municipal Stadium.

At the time of the Pheasants' dissolution, their working agreement was the longest ever between a major and minor league baseball team. Aberdeen won the Northern League championship in 1949, 1961, and 1964.

== History ==
In 1946, the Northern League, which had been on hiatus since 1942 due to World War II, restarted and invited Aberdeen to bring the circuit up to eight teams. The name "Pheasants" was chosen for the club through a local contest. The team was community-owned, which was unusual for the time.

The first Opening Day for the Pheasants drew a crowd of over two thousand people. After missing the postseason in their first year, the Pheasants would go on to play in the league finals three straight years from 1947 to 1949. Aberdeen won the Northern League championship in 1949, defeating the Eau Claire Bears.

=== 1964 exhibition vs. Baltimore ===
On 8 June, 1964, the Pheasants' parent club, the Baltimore Orioles, came to Aberdeen to play an exhibition game. Aberdeen, which featured future major leaguers such as Mark Belanger, Jim Palmer, and Lou Piniella, came into the game leading the Northern League with a 31–9 record, while the Orioles were 31–17 and ½ game behind the White Sox for the American League lead.

The Orioles, arriving on a charter plane from Minneapolis, had to bring a ladder along to disembark, as Aberdeen's airport had no portable stairs. Pheasants players were quoted as saying, "We're gonna beat 'em and climb onto that big plane. They can stay here and finish the Northern League schedule." Official attendance for the game was 5,130 — one-fifth of Aberdeen's entire population — but local news estimated that another thousand people watched from vantage points outside the ballpark. The Orioles won the game, 6–3.

=== Demise ===
After the 1971 season, the Northern League only had two teams remaining: the Pheasants and the St. Cloud Rox. Unable to find any other teams, the Northern League closed down. Aberdeen's working agreement with the Orioles franchise had been the longest-running working agreement in baseball, lasting the entirety of the Pheasants' existence.

Aberdeen would be without professional baseball until the Aberdeen Pheasants of the Prairie League began play in 1995.

== Mascot ==
The team's mascot was a cartoon pheasant named Philbert, drawn by local cartoonist Gordon Haug. Philbert would appear on the front page of the newspaper to comment on the previous day's game.

== Notable alumni ==
Baseball Hall of Fame Alumni
- Jim Palmer (1964) inducted, 1990
- Norm Stewart (1957) National Collegiate Basketball Hall of Fame, inducted 2007
- Earl Weaver (1959) inducted, 1996

Notable alumni

- Bob Bailor (1971)
- Steve Barber (1958) 2x MLB All-Star
- Mark Belanger (1964) MLB All-Star; 8x Gold Glove shortstop
- Bo Belinsky (1958-1959) Belinsky had a career record of only 28–51, but threw the first no-hitter in the history of the Los Angeles Angels and the first one at Chavez Ravine (Dodger Stadium), beating the Baltimore Orioles 2–0 on May 5, 1962.
- Al Bumbry (1971) MLB All-Star; 1973 AL Rookie of the Year
- Andy Etchebarren (1961, 1963) 2x MLB All-Star
- Tito Francona (1953) MLB All-Star
- Roger Freed (1967)
- Don Heffner (1947)
- Chuck Hinton (1959) MLB All-Star
- Darold Knowles (1963) MLB All-Star
- Don Larsen (1947-1948) 1956 World Series Most Valuable Player
- Lou Piniella (1964) MLB All-Star; 1969 AL Rookie of the Year; 3x MLB Manager of the Year
- Cal Ripken Sr. (1963-1964)
- Wes Stock (1956)
- Bob Turley (1949) 3x MLB All-Star; 1958 AL Cy Young Award; 1958 World Series Most Valuable Player
- Eddie Watt (1963-1964)

== Year-by-year record ==
Year	Parent club	League	W–L	Win%	Place	Manager	Postseason	Attendance	Ref
Aberdeen Pheasants
1946	SLB	NOR	57–53	.518	5th	Gus Albright	-	57,008	
1947	SLB	NOR	82–36	.695	1st	Don Heffner	Won 1st round 3–2 vs. Fargo–Moorhead; Lost finals 2–4 vs. Sioux Falls	90,156	
1948	SLB	NOR	64–59	.520	4th	James Crandall	Won 1st round 3–0 vs. Eau Claire; Lost finals 0–4 vs. Grand Forks	85,942	
1949	SLB	NOR	71–54	.568	2nd	Irvin Hall	Won 1st round 3–1 vs. Superior; Won finals 4–1 vs. Eau Claire	85,624	
1950s
1950	SLB	NOR	62–57	.521	5th	Irvin Hall	–	61,208	
1951	SLB	NOR	61–60	.504	5th	Joe King; Jim Post; Bruce Ogrodowski	–	62,203	
1952	SLB	NOR	63–62	.504	5th	Bruce Ogrodowski	–	87,879	
1953	SLB	NOR	60–63	.488	4th	Barney Lutz	Lost 1st round 0–2 vs. Duluth	54,532	
1954	BAL	NOR	60–75	.444	7th	Barney Lutz	–	62,503	
1955	BAL	NOR	70–56	.556	4th	Bill Krueger	Lost 1st round 1–2 vs. Eau Claire	75,401	
1956	BAL	NOR	64–61	.512	4th	George Staller	Won 1st round 1–0 vs. Winnipeg; Lost finals 2–0 vs. Duluth–Superior	60,673	
1957	BAL	NOR	51–70	.421	7th	Bill Capps; Barney Lutz	–	47,312	
1958	BAL	NOR	39–86	.312	8th	Barney Lutz; Billy DeMars	–	36,599	
1959	BAL	NOR	69–55	.556	2nd	Earl Weaver	Won 1st round 1–0 vs. Minot; Lost finals 1–2 vs. Winnipeg	63,111	
1960s
1960	BAL	NOR	63–61	.508	3rd	Lou Fitzgerald	Lost 1st round 0–1 vs. Winnipeg	45,321	
1961	BAL	NOR	74–54	.578	2nd	Lou Fitzgerald	Won 1st round 1–0 vs. Grand Forks; Won finals 2–0 vs. St. Cloud	34,136	
1962	BAL	NOR	64–60	.516	4th	Billy DeMars	Won 1st round 1–0 vs. Duluth–Superior; Lost finals 0–2 vs. Eau Claire	39,101	
1963	BAL	NOR	65–55	.542	2nd	Cal Ripken Sr.	3rd in Baukol Playoffs (Note: In the Baukol Playoffs, a team's record over the final 30 games of their season was used to determine their playoff finish.)	39,949	
1964	BAL	NOR	80–37	.684	1st	Cal Ripken Sr.	1st in Baukol Playoffs	46,397	
1965	BAL	NOR	27–39	.409	4th	Ray Rippelmeyer	–	23,525	
1966	BAL	NOR	47–22	.681	2nd	Cal Ripken Sr.	–	24,767	
1967	BAL	NOR	34–36	.486	4th	Owen Friend	–	18,555	
1968	BAL	NOR	26–44	.371	6th	Bill Werle	–	15,517	
1969	BAL	NOR	28–42	.400	5th	Ken Rowe	–	15,546	
1970s
1970	BAL	NOR	36–33	.522	3rd	Ken Rowe	–	20,880	
1971	BAL	NOR	35–36	.493	2nd	Ken Rowe	–	17,467	
Totals			1452–1366	.515				1,271,312	
