= Independence League Baseball =

Collegiate summer baseball league

- Most recent season or competition: 2026
- Classification: Collegiate summer baseball
- Sport: Baseball
- Founded: 2021
- First season: 2022
- No. of teams: 7
- Country: United States
- Most recent champion: Spearfish Sasquach (2026)
- Website: independenceleague.com

Independence League Baseball is a collegiate summer baseball league in the United States with teams playing in Nebraska, South Dakota, and Wyoming. The league played its inaugural season in 2022 with ten teams and had eight teams for 2023. As of January 2024, eight teams are listed for the 2024 season.

== History ==
The league was announced in October 2021 with seven teams which were leaving the Expedition League:

- Badlands Big Sticks (Dickinson, North Dakota)
- Canyon County Spuds (Caldwell, Idaho)
- Casper Horseheads (Casper, Wyoming)
- Fremont Moo (Fremont, Nebraska)
- Hastings Sodbusters (Hastings, Nebraska)
- Spearfish Sasquatch (Spearfish, South Dakota)
- Western Nebraska Pioneers (Gering, Nebraska)

For the 2022 season, the league added the Gem City Bison (Laramie, Wyoming), the North Platte Plainsmen (North Platte, Nebraska), and the Nebraska Prospects, a traveling team to balance the schedule. The Western Nebraska Pioneers were the champions of the inaugural season.

For the 2023 season, the Oahe Zap were founded in Pierre, South Dakota while the North Platte Plainsmen and the Western Nebraska Pioneers left the league to play their own independent schedules. In December 2022, the Casper Horseheads ceased operations after four years in the two leagues and the Canyon County Spuds announced their relocation from Caldwell, Idaho to Casper, Wyoming to become the Casper Spuds. In January 2023, the Gem City Bison announced that they were skipping the 2023 season, citing "ongoing challenges", and that they will be "working diligently" to return in 2024. In February 2023, the Sawtooth Sockeyes (Caldwell, Idaho) joined the league as an unaffiliated, travel only team to help balance the schedule.

The 2023 season also introduced a new format to the league playoffs. The new format split the league into two half-seasons. The winner of the first half would face off against the second half winner in a 5-game series. The Fremont Moo captured the first-half title, while the Casper Spuds would secure their playoff spot with a second-half run. The championship series came down to game five, winner-take-all, with the Fremont Moo winning the League Championship.

In October 2023, the Badlands Big Sticks left the league to join the Northwoods League for the 2024 season.

In October 2025, the Hastings Sodbusters and Fremont Moo announced they would be leaving to join the newly formed Diamond Baseball League.

As of December 2025, the league has three teams as members for the 2026 season (Casper Spuds, Oahe Zap, Spearfish Sasquatch) and three teams as unaffiliated, travel only teams (Fort Collins Foxes, Capital City Aviators, Bison Baseball).

In September 2026, the Gering Sugar Beets, Gering, Nebraska, would be an expansion team for the 2027 season.

In October 2026, the Bison baseball club announced they would be moving to Mitchell, South Dakota, to become the Palace City Bison. Playing home games at Cadwell Park.

== Teams ==
=== Current members ===
Current teams
Team	Founded	Joined	Stadium	City	Capacity
Spearfish Sasquatch	2018	2022	Black Hills Energy Stadium	Spearfish, SD	1,100
Casper Spuds	2021	2022	Mike Lansing Field	Casper, WY	2,500
Oahe Zap	2023	2023	Hyde Stadium	Pierre, SD	1,200
Fort Collins Foxes	2005	2026	City Park Field	Fort Collins, CO	500
Gering Sugar Beets	2026	2027	Oregon Trail Park Stadium	Gering, NE	1,200
Palace City Bison	2024	2024	Cadwell Park	Mitchell, SD	1,800
Capital City Aviators	2026	2026	None (traveling team)	Cheyenne, WY	n/a

=== Former members ===
Former teams
Team	Years	City	Stadium	Disposition
Casper Horseheads	2022	Casper, WY	Mike Lansing Field	Founded 2018. Discontinued
North Platte Plainsmen	2022	North Platte, NE	Historic Bill Wood Field	Founded 2022. Left to become independent.
Western Nebraska Pioneers	2022	Gering, NE	Oregon Trail Park Stadium	Founded 2018. Left to become independent.
Gem City Bison	2022	Laramie, WY	Cowboy Field	Founded 2022. Planning to return in 2024.
Badlands Big Sticks	2022–23	Dickinson, ND	Dakota Community Bank & Trust Ballpark	Founded 2018. Left to join Northwoods League.
Sawtooth Sockeyes	2023	Caldwell, ID	None (traveling team)	Founded 2023.
Hastings Sodbusters	2022–2025	Hastings, NE	Duncan Field	Founded 2018. Left to join the Diamond Baseball League.
Fremont Moo	2022–2025	Fremont, NE	Moller Field	Founded 2019. Left to join the Diamond Baseball League.
Nebraska Prospects	2022–2025	n/a	None (traveling team)	Founded 2022.

== Champions ==
=== Baseball champions ===
Season	Champion	Runner-up
2022	Western Nebraska Pioneers	Spearfish Sasquatch
2023	Fremont Moo	Casper Spuds
2024	Casper Spuds	Fremont Moo
2025	Spearfish Sasquatch	Oahe Zap
2026	Spearfish Sasquatch (2)	Casper Spuds

== Map ==
=== Current Team Locations ===
Locations of Independence Baseball League teams
