= Mike Lansing =

American baseball player (born 1968)

- Second baseman
- Born: April 3, 1968 (age 58); Rawlins, Wyoming, U.S.
- Batted: Right Threw: Right

MLB debut
- April 7, 1993, for the Montreal Expos

Last MLB appearance
- September 8, 2001, for the Boston Red Sox

MLB statistics
- Batting average: .271
- Home runs: 84
- Runs batted in: 440
- Stats at Baseball Reference

Teams
- Montreal Expos (1993–1997); Colorado Rockies (1998–2000); Boston Red Sox (2000–2001)

Michael Thomas Lansing (born April 3, 1968) is an American former professional baseball second baseman. He played in Major League Baseball (MLB) for the Montreal Expos, Colorado Rockies, and Boston Red Sox between 1993 and 2001. During his playing days, he had the nickname "the Laser."

== Amateur career ==
Lansing attended Wichita State University, and in 1988 he played collegiate summer baseball with the Harwich Mariners of the Cape Cod Baseball League. Utilizing a never-before-used rule, Lansing was drafted late in the 6th round of the 1990 MLB draft by the Miami Miracle, an independent minor league team. Lansing played two seasons with the Miracle before making the major league with the Expos in 1993.

== Professional career ==
Lansing made his major league debut in the lineup early on in 1993 as a second baseman. In one of his first games, Lansing had five hits in a win over the Rockies. Lansing had his best season in 1996, finishing with a .285 batting average and 183 hits in 159 games. Lansing also had 40 doubles that season, placing 6th.

In 1997 Lansing had career bests in home runs, 20, and RBIs, 70. On May 7, 1997, in a game against the San Francisco Giants, Lansing became the first National League second baseman since Bobby Lowe in 1894 to home run twice in the same inning. Lansing also became the third Expo to do so. After the 1997 season, Lansing was traded to the Colorado Rockies for a couple of minor leaguers.

On June 18, 2000, in a game against the Arizona Diamondbacks, Lansing hit for the cycle faster than any player in MLB history, completing it by the fourth inning in a 19–2 win. A little more than a month later, Lansing, along with a couple of pitchers, was traded by the Rockies to the Boston Red Sox. He played a couple of seasons with the Red Sox before being released into free agency after the 2001 season. Lansing was signed as a free agent by the Cleveland Indians, but played in the minors and suffered a back injury before retiring after the 2002 season. In 2001, while playing with Boston, Lansing made a catch for the second-to-last out, helping to preserve Hideo Nomo's no-hitter vs. the Baltimore Orioles.

Mike Lansing Field, the stadium which is the home field of the Casper Spuds of Independence League Baseball, is named for Lansing. In 1999, Lansing accompanied Denver Police on a fatal SWAT raid that killed Ismail Mena. The team was at the wrong address.

== Mitchell Report ==
On December 13, 2007, former senator George Mitchell released his report to the commissioner of Major League Baseball concerning the use of illegal steroids and performance-enhancing drugs in baseball. The following is an excerpt of the report referring to Lansing.

"According to [Kirk] Radomski, he was introduced to Lansing by David Segui while Segui and Lansing played together with the Expos. Radomski recalled that he engaged in four to five “small transactions” with Lansing. Radomski said that Lansing was familiar with testosterone and “knew exactly what he wanted.” Radomski produced two $1,000 money orders from Lansing, retrieved from his bank, made payable to Radomski; both were dated February 5, 2002... Radomski stated that this payment was for testosterone and one kit of human growth hormone. During the search of Radomski's residence, an undated, partial shipping label was seized with Lansing's name on it and a Colorado address. We have confirmed that Lansing resided at this address when he played with the Rockies. Lansing's name, with an address and two telephone numbers, is listed in the address book seized from Radomski's residence by federal agents."

== See also ==
- List of Major League Baseball players to hit for the cycle
- List of Major League Baseball players named in the Mitchell Report

Awards and achievements
Preceded by Scott Livingstone	Topps Rookie All-Star Third Baseman; 1993	Succeeded by José Oliva
Preceded by Jason Kendall	Hitting for the cycle June 18, 2000	Succeeded by Eric Chavez
