= Dakota Community Bank & Trust Ballpark =

Baseball stadium in Dickinson, North Dakota, US

- Location within North Dakota Location within the United States
- Interactive map of Dakota Community Bank & Trust Ballpark
- Address: 240 2nd St SE; Dickinson, North Dakota
- Coordinates: 46°52′23″N 102°47′11″W
- Capacity: 1,200
- Field size: Left field: 320 ft (98 m); Left center: 385 ft (117 m); Center field: 375 ft (114 m); Right center: 385 ft (117 m); Right field: 320 ft (98 m)

Tenants
- Dickinson Packers (MDL) 1955–1956; Badlands Big Sticks (EXL/ILB/NWL) 2018–present Dickinson State University Blue Hawks (NSAA); Dickinson High School Mavericks (NDHSAA); American Legion Baseball

Dakota Community Bank & Trust Ballpark is a baseball stadium in Dickinson, North Dakota. It is home to the Badlands Big Sticks of the Northwoods League, a collegiate summer baseball league; the Dickinson State University Blue Hawks baseball team; the Dickinson High School Mavericks baseball team; and American Legion Baseball. In 1955 and 1956, the ballpark was home to the Dickinson Packers baseball team (also known as the Queen City Packers) of the Mandak League, an independent baseball league based in Manitoba and North Dakota.
