= Corbett Field =

Corbett Field may refer to:

- Corbett Field (Minot), a baseball park in Minot, North Dakota
- Hi Corbett Field, a baseball stadium in Tucson, Arizona
- Corbett Field (Wyoming), the former football field at the University of Wyoming in Laramie, Wyoming
- Corbett Stadium, a soccer field in Tampa, Florida
