= Mills Field =

Baseball stadium in Brainerd, Minnesota

Coordinates: 46.377395°N 94.175341°W

Mills Field is a baseball stadium in Brainerd, Minnesota. It is primarily used for baseball, and was the home field of the Brainerd Lakes Area Lunkers baseball team. It was built in 1994 and holds 2,500 people.
