= Spearfish Sasquatch =

- Logo

Information
- League: Independence League Baseball (Great Plains Division)
- Location: Spearfish, South Dakota
- Ballpark: Black Hills Energy Stadium
- Founded: 2017
- League championships: 1 (2025)
- Division championships: 2 (2021, 2022)
- Former league: Expedition League
- Colors: Black, Light Blue, Light Gray
- Ownership: Eric Schmidt
- General manager: Eric Schmidt
- Manager: Jarrett Hunt
- Website: www.spearfishsasquatch.com//

The Spearfish Sasquatch is a baseball team in the Independence League Baseball based in Spearfish, South Dakota. They are one of two teams based in South Dakota, their home games are played at Black Hills Energy Stadium. They were formed in October 2017. They played in the Expedition League in 2018, 2019 and 2021 before joining the new Independence League Baseball for the 2022 season.

In 2025, the Spearfish Sasquatch won their first ever Independence League Championship, sweeping the Oahe Zap in a best of five series.

== Record by year ==
Year	W	L
2018	24	38
2019	28	33
2021	46	22
2022	30	31
2023	27	29
2024	30	20
2025	35	17

Due to the COVID-19 pandemic, the Spearfish Sasquatch opted out of the 2020 season.

== Coaching staff ==
- Head Coach: Jarrett Hunt
- Assistant Coach: Anthony Peterson
