= Eau Claire Bears =

- 1933–1962; (1933–1942, 1946–1962); Eau Claire, Wisconsin

Team logo	Cap insignia

Minor league affiliations
- Class: Class C (1941–1942, 1946–1962); Class D (1933–1940)
- League: Northern League (1933–1942, 1946–1962)

Major league affiliations
- Team: Boston Braves/Milwaukee Braves (1947–1962); Chicago Cubs (1937–1938); Boston Red Sox (1936)

Minor league titles
- League titles (3): 1936; 1941; 1962

Team data
- Name: Eau Claire Braves (1954–1962); Eau Claire Bears (1933–1953); Eau Claire Cardinals (part of 1933)
- Ballpark: Carson Park (1937–1962); Chappell Field (1933–1936)

The Eau Claire Bears was the primary nickname of the minor league baseball teams from Eau Claire, Wisconsin. Eau Claire was a member of the Class C Northern League (1933–1942, 1946–1962) and were affiliates of the Boston Red Sox (1936), Chicago Cubs (1937–1939) and the Boston Braves (1947–1962).

The team played its home games at Carson Park in Eau Claire.

Baseball Hall of Fame inductees Hank Aaron, Joe Torre and Ford C. Frick Award recipient Bob Uecker played for Eau Claire.

== History ==
Originally named the Eau Claire Cardinals, the team adopted its most enduring nickname when new owners bought the team in July of its first season. Beginning in 1954, the Eau Claire Bears were renamed the Eau Claire Braves after the Boston Braves moved to Milwaukee.

The Bears, along with the rest of the Northern League, did not play the 1943-45 seasons due to World War II.

After the 1962 season, both Eau Claire and Minot dropped out of the Northern League as the league contracted to six teams. Eau Claire club officials cited lack of interest in minor league baseball.

In 1998, an amateur team in Eau Claire began using the Bears name and has been a member of the Chippewa River Baseball League ever since. Along with many league titles, they also won the Wisconsin Baseball Association (WBA) state championship in 2005, 2008, and 2009.

== The ballparks ==
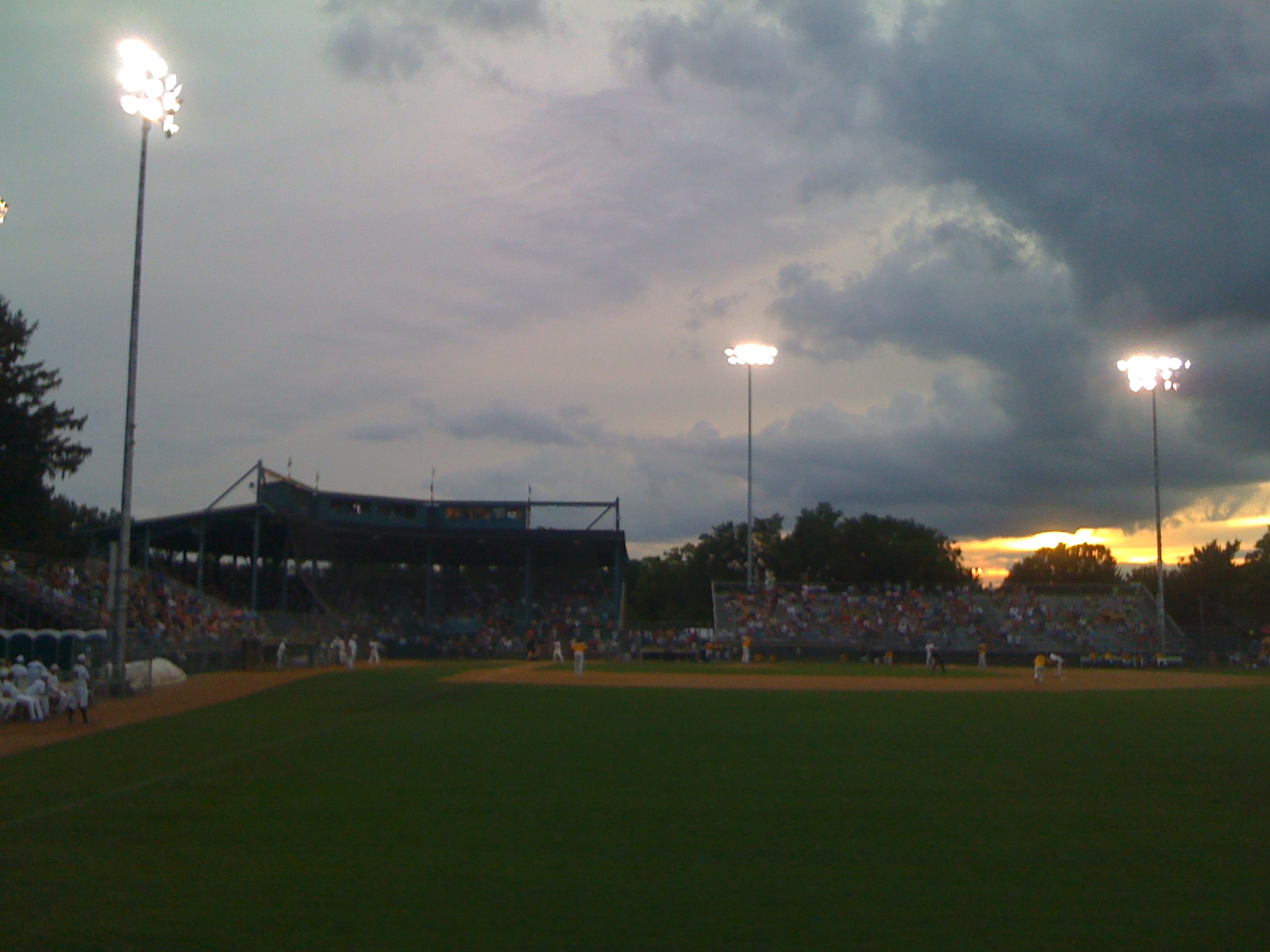
Carson Park, 2009

From 1933-1938 Eau Claire played at Chappell Field, which seated 2,000 with temporary bleachers.

From 1937 to 1962, Eau Claire teams played at Carson Park, which still exists today. Built in 1937, the park had a capacity of 3500. It is located at 1 Carson Park Drive in Eau Claire, Wisconsin.

Today, Carson Park is home to the Eau Claire Express of the summer collegiate Northwoods League and the Eau Claire Bears of the Chippewa River Baseball League.

== Hank Aaron ==
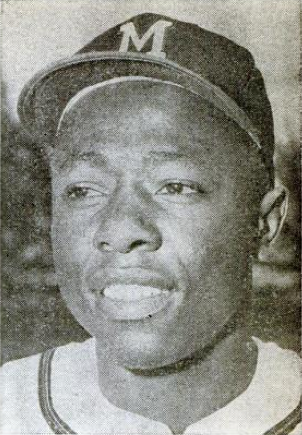
Hank Aaron, 1960

The most accomplished player in the team's history was Hall of Famer Hank Aaron, who made his minor league début with the team in 1952. Aaron arrived to the team in mid June, 1952, after signing a contract with the Braves on June 15 for $350 per month. Aaron played shortstop and breaking from his cross-handed style of batting, was selected to play in the 1952 Northern League All-Star Game. He was selected as the league's Rookie of the Year at the conclusion of the season. Aaron hit .336 with 9 Home Runs for Eau Claire, helping the team to a 72-53 record.

Today, there is a statue of Aaron and plaque in front of Carson Park to honor his achievements. Aaron was present for the statue dedication ceremonies on August 17, 1994.

== Notable Eau Claire alumni ==
- Hank Aaron (1952) Inducted Baseball Hall of Fame, 1982
- Joe Torre (1960) Inducted Baseball Hall of Fame, 2014
- Bob Uecker (1956-1957) Inducted, Ford C. Frick Award (2003)
- Bill Robinson (1962)
- Rico Carty (1961) MLB All-Star; 1970 NL batting champion
- Walt Hriniak (1961)
- Denny Lemaster (1958) MLB All-Star
- Tony Cloninger (1958)
- Tommie Aaron (1958-1959)
- Lee Maye (1955)
- Charlie Root (1954, MGR)
- Wes Covington (1952)
- Johnny Goryl (1952)
- Bill Bruton (1950) 3× NL stolen base leader
- Pete Whisenant (1947)
- Chuck Tanner (1947-1948) Manager: 1979 World Series Champion - Pittsburgh Pirates
- Jim Delsing (1946) (Father of Pro Golfer Jay Delsing)
- Dave Garcia (1942)
- Rosy Ryan (1941-1942) 1961 King of Baseball Award
- Wes Westrum (1941) 2× MLB All-Star
- Andy Pafko (1940) 5× MLB All-Star
- Stan Spence (1935) 4× MLB All-Star
- Hank Majeski (1935)
- Johnny Mostil (1933-1937) 2× AL stolen base leader
