= Mike Lansing Field =

Stadium in Casper, Wyoming

- Interactive map of Mike Lansing Field
- Address: 330 Kati Lane; Casper, Wyoming
- Coordinates: 42.860473°N 106.329712°W
- Owner: City of Casper, Wyoming
- Operator: City of Casper, Wyoming
- Capacity: 2,500
- Surface: Grass
- Field size: Left field: 355 feet (108 m); Center field: 400 feet (120 m); Right field: 345 feet (105 m)

Construction
- Opened: 2002
- Cost: $1.77 Million

Tenants
- Casper Ghosts (PL) 2001–2011; Casper Cutthroats (MCBL) 2012–2014; Casper Horseheads (ILB) 2018–2022; Casper Spuds (ILB) 2023–present Casper Oilers (AmLeg) 2002–present

Mike Lansing Field is a stadium in Casper, Wyoming. It is primarily used for baseball. It was the home field of the Casper Ghosts minor league baseball team from 2002 to 2011, of the Casper Cutthroats summer-collegiate baseball team from 2012 to 2014, and of the Casper Horseheads of Independence League Baseball from 2018 to 2022. It is home to the Casper Oilers American Legion Baseball team, and the Casper Spuds of Independence League Baseball. It was built in 2002 and holds 2,500 people. The field is named after Wyoming native and former Major League second baseman Mike Lansing. A career .271 hitter, Lansing played nine years in the majors for the Montreal Expos, Colorado Rockies and Boston Red Sox.

Lansing Field was one of the ten ballparks included in a 2010 USA Today article about "10 great places for a baseball pilgrimage", which noted the highly "intimate" character of the park due to its unusual combination of a small grandstand and surrounding "wide-open space" at its location on the banks of the North Platte River. The ballpark's souvenir shop was known to visiting baseball fans for sales of the team's unusual glow-in-the-dark cap.

Mike Lansing Field replaced a sports complex/park known locally as Crossroads. It is located just south of the Casper Events Center across Poplar Street from the Casper Planetarium.
