= Burleigh County Courthouse =

- U.S. National Register of Historic Places
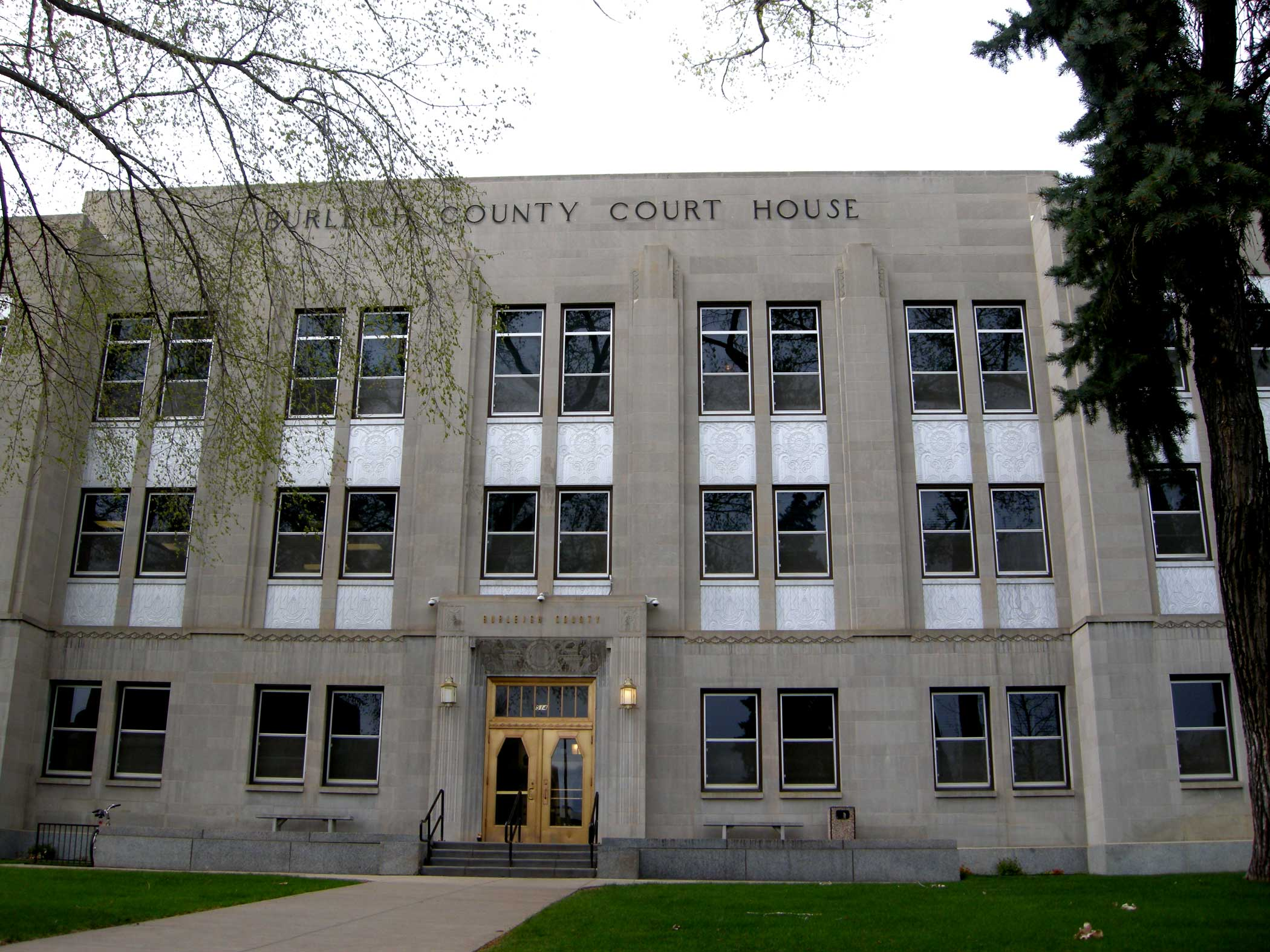

- Location within North Dakota Location within the United States
- Interactive map showing the location of Burleigh County Courthouse
- Location: E. Thayer Ave., Bismarck, North Dakota
- Coordinates: 46°48′28″N 100°47′1″W
- Area: 2.1 acres (0.85 ha)
- Built: 1931
- Built by: Redlinger & Hansen
- Architect: Ira Rush
- Architectural style: Art Deco
- MPS: North Dakota County Courthouses TR
- NRHP reference No.: 85002980
- Added to NRHP: November 14, 1985

The Burleigh County Courthouse in Bismarck, North Dakota was designed in the Art Deco style by architect Ira Rush. It was built in 1931 and was listed on the U.S. National Register of Historic Places in 1985.

It is a three-story courthouse with a two-story office addition. It has aluminum spandrels.

== See also ==
- Adams County Courthouse, also designed by Rush and NRHP-listed
