= Carson Park (baseball stadium) =

Stadium in Eau Claire, Wisconsin, US

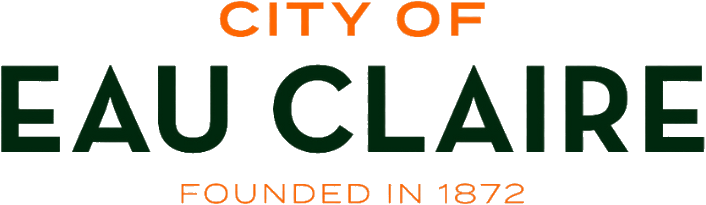

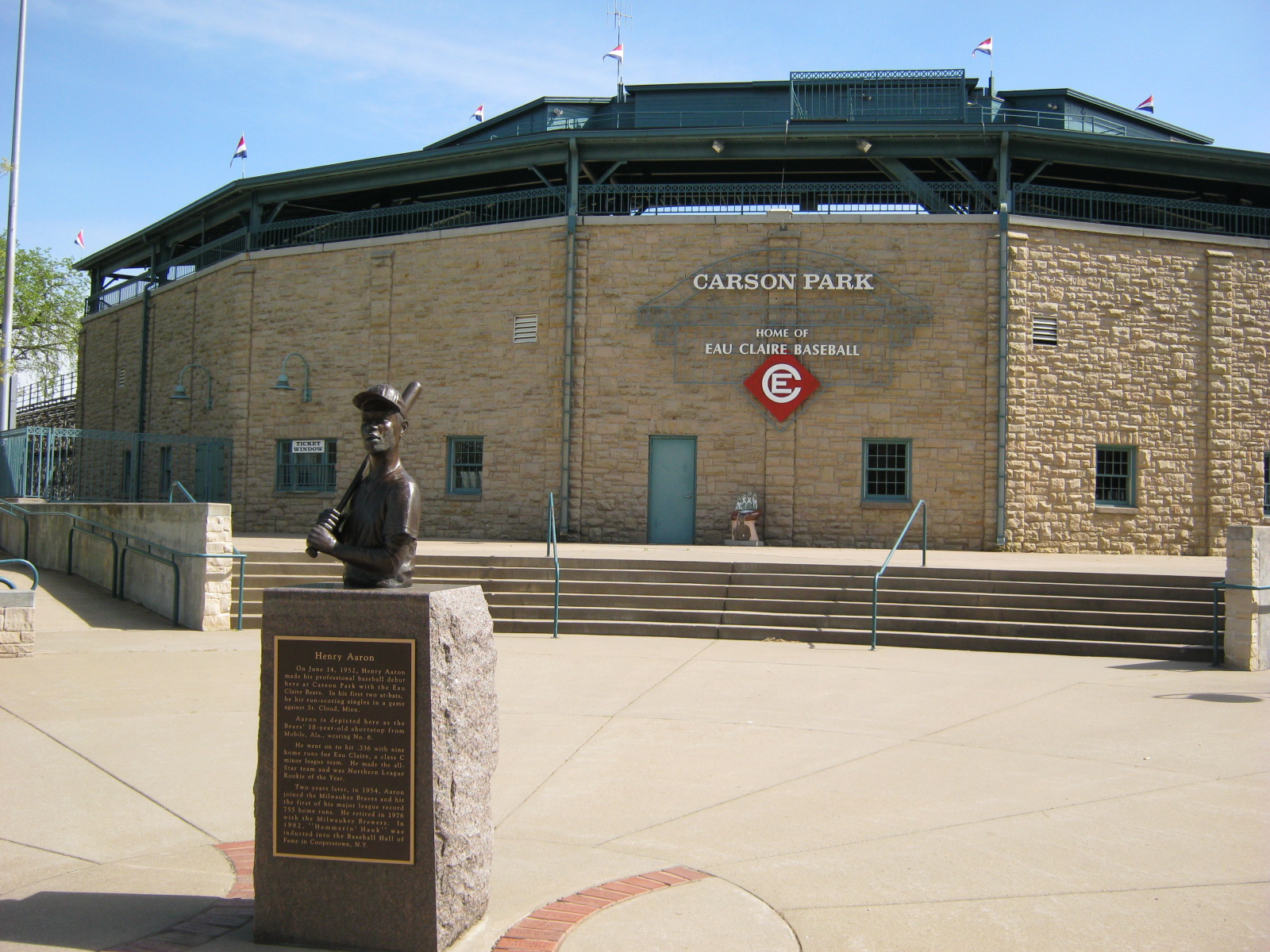
- Main entrance to the stadium, 2012
- Interactive map of Carson Park
- Location: 44° 48′ 26″ N, 91° 31′ 14″ W One Carson Park Drive; Eau Claire, Wisconsin 54701, US
- Owner: City of Eau Claire
- Capacity: 2,856
- Surface: Natural grass
- Field size: Left Field: 320 ft Center Field: 388 ft Right Field: 312 ft

Construction
- Opened: May 4, 1937; 89 years ago
- Cost: $60,000 USD

Tenants
- Eau Claire Bears (NL) 1937–1942; Eau Claire Braves (NL) 1946–1962; Eau Claire Cavaliers 1971–present; Eau Claire Express (NWL) 2005–present; Wisconsin–Eau Claire Blugolds (NCAA)
- Carson Park Baseball Stadium
- U.S. National Register of Historic Places
- Location within Wisconsin Location within the United States
- Location: Carson Park Dr., Carson Park, Eau Claire, Wisconsin
- Coordinates: 44°48′29″N 91°31′13″W
- Area: 6 acres (2.4 ha)
- Built: 1936
- Architectural style: Late 19th and Early 20th Century American Movements
- NRHP reference No.: 03000698
- Added to NRHP: July 25, 2003

Website
- visiteauclaire.com/carson-park

Carson Park is a baseball stadium located in Carson Park, a park in Eau Claire, Wisconsin. It was built as a Works Progress Administration project in 1936, and it is listed on the National Register of Historic Places.

The stadium is home to the Eau Claire Express of the Northwoods League, the Eau Claire Cavaliers amateur team, the Eau Claire Bears amateur team, the Eau Claire Pizza Hut American Legion team, the Eau Claire Memorial, North, Regis and Immanuel Lutheran high school baseball teams, and the UW-Eau Claire (NCAA) baseball team.

The left field wall is adjacent to the sideline of the Carson Park football stadium field. During the football season, temporary bleachers from the baseball stadium are positioned on left field with the front of the bleachers placed along the left field wall facing the football field.

== History ==
The land that became home to Carson Park, located on a peninsula surrounded by Half Moon Lake in Eau Claire, was donated in 1914 to the city of Eau Claire by an heir to William Carson. The following year, the park was opened. Construction of a sports complex, including a baseball stadium, football stadium and tennis courts, began in 1935 as a Works Progress Administration project. The first game was played in the stadium on May 4, 1937, in a Northern League game between the Eau Claire Bears and Superior Blues.

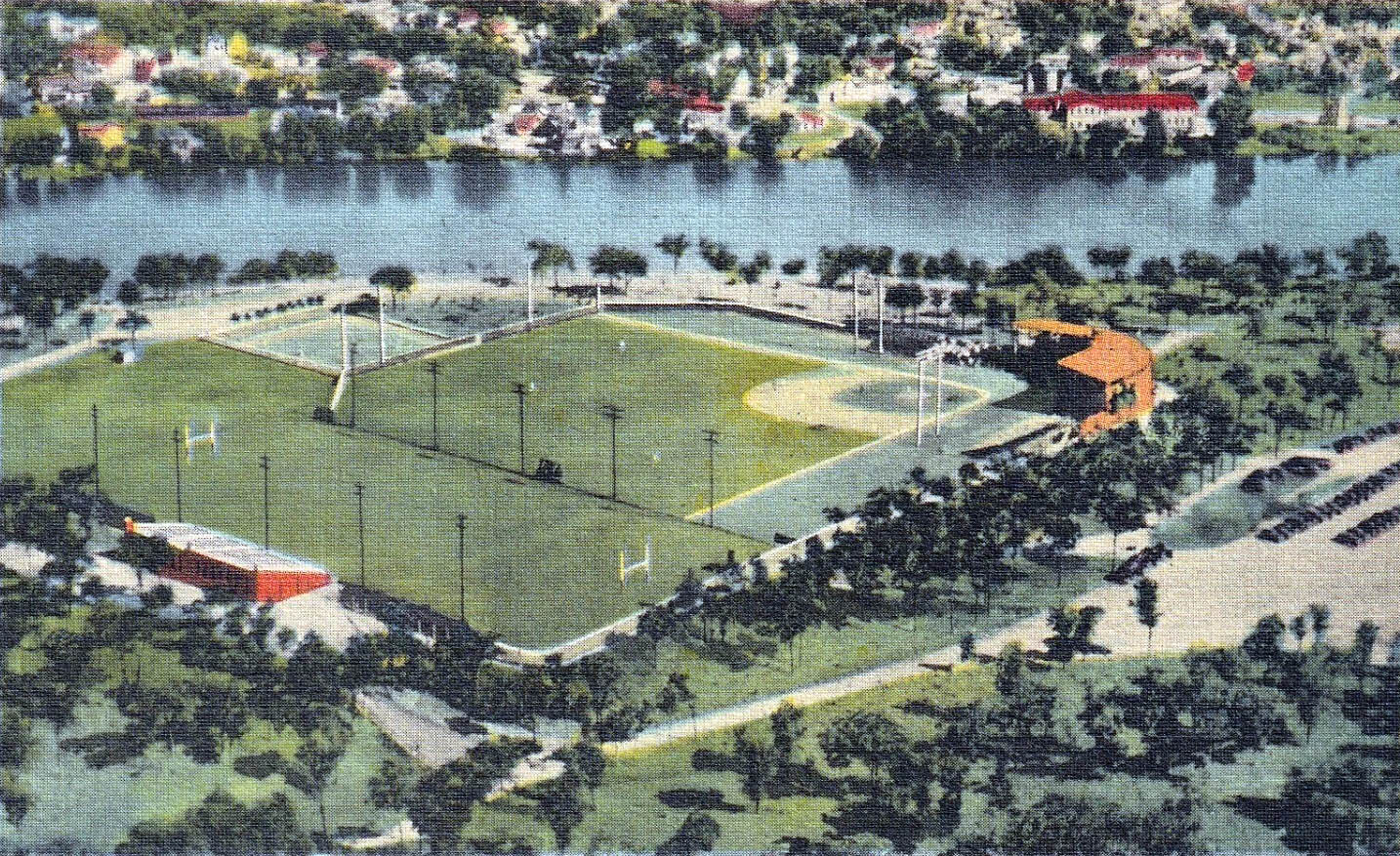
Aerial view of the stadium in an old postcard

The stadium later was home to the Eau Claire Braves minor league baseball team. Among those who played for the Braves were Hank Aaron, Joe Torre, Bob Uecker, Andy Pafko and others who later played in Major League Baseball. Following the departure of the Braves in the 1960s, the Eau Claire Cavaliers amateur team began play in 1971. Under manager Harv Tomter, the team won 5 amateur baseball national championships.

A statue honoring Hank Aaron was erected in front of the stadium in 1994. A renovation project around 1997/98 added permanent seats behind home plate, benches in the lower areas of the grandstand, and a remodeled concourse and exterior.

Upon the arrival of the Eau Claire Express Northwoods League franchise in 2005, the stadium underwent renovations for that season. A fan deck was added in the right field corner, a children's area was added along the 3rd-base foul line near the left field corner, and an electronic message board was added to the scoreboard. The field was re-leveled and re-sodded prior to the 2007 season. The press box was expanded with new sections along the first- and third-base sides for the 2009 season.

For the 2025 Eau Claire Express season, a 36' by 20' Daktronics video board (known as the "WNB Financial Video Board") was installed in the outfield scoreboard location.
