= Minot Hot Tots =

Baseball team in North Dakota, United States

- Logo

Information
- League: Northwoods League (Great Plains West Division)
- Location: Minot, North Dakota
- Ballpark: Corbett Field
- Founded: 2022
- Colors: Blue, red, gold, dark gold, white
- Ownership: John Bollinger, Glenn Bosch, Terry Daffinrud, Bryan Vibeto, & Jarid Lundeen
- General manager: Monica Blake
- Manager: Mitchell Gallagher
- Website: northwoodsleague.com/minot-hot-tots/

The Minot Hot Tots are a baseball team that plays in the Northwoods League (a collegiate summer baseball league). Based in Minot, North Dakota, the Hot Tots play their home games at Corbett Field.

== History ==
On February 16, 2022, the Minot Parks and Recreation Board voted in favor of entering into negotiations with the Northwoods League to bring an expansion team to the city to replace the Souris Valley Sabre Dogs of the Expedition League, whose lease on Corbett Field had expired and were set to disband following the 2022 season. The negotiations proved successful, and the Northwoods League held a press conference at Corbett Field on August 24 to announce that a new expansion team in the league would be coming to Minot, to begin play in the summer of 2023.

The team name was decided on by the public via a "Name Your Team" contest, with name submissions being taken during August and September. Name finalists were announced on September 12, with the 5 top choices being the Dakrats, Hot Tots, Why Nots, Berserkers, and Night Owls. On October 21, it was announced that the team would play as the Minot Hot Tots, with the name in reference to hotdish, a popular meal in the Upper Midwest.

== Northwoods League All-Stars ==
The following Hot Tots have been selected to either the Northwoods League mid-season All-Star Game and/or the full-season All-Star Team.

Player	Position	College	Season	Mid-season or full-season
Drew Woodcox	OF	Texas Tech	2023	Mid-season
Evan Dempsey	P	Florida Gulf Coast	2024	Mid-season
Matt Toomey	UTL	Long Beach State	2025	Mid-season
Henry Allen	OF	Georgia	2025	Both
Blake Cavill	1B	Troy	2025	Full-season
Kellan Burke	OF	Nebraska	2026	Mid-season
