= Williston Oilers =

- 1954–1957; Williston, North Dakota

Minor league affiliations
- Class: Independent (1954–1957)
- League: Manitoba-Dakota League (1954–1957)

Major league affiliations
- Team: None

Minor league titles
- League titles (1): 1956
- Conference titles (1): 1956
- Wild card berths (3): 1954; 1955; 1957

Team data
- Name: Williston Oilers (1954–1957)
- Ballpark: Ardean Aafedt Stadium (1954–1957)

The Williston Oilers were a minor league baseball team based in Williston, North Dakota. The "Oilers" played as members of the Independent level Manitoba-Dakota League from 1954 to 1957, winning the 1956 league championship. The league folded following the 1957 season.

The Williston Oilers teams hosted home minor league games at Ardean Aafeldt Stadium, which is still in use today.

== History ==
Minor league baseball began in Williston, North Dakota in 1954, when the Williston "Oilers" began play as members of the four-team, independent level Manitoba-Dakota League, known as the "Mandak League." The Brandon Greys, Carman Cardinals and Minot Mallards teams joined the Oilers in beginning play in the league. The new Williston franchise replaced the Winnipeg Royals in the league.

The Williston use of the "Oilers" nickname corresponds to local history and industry in the era. Williston is home to numerous oil fields, first discovered in 1936 and is the namesake of the Williston Basin.

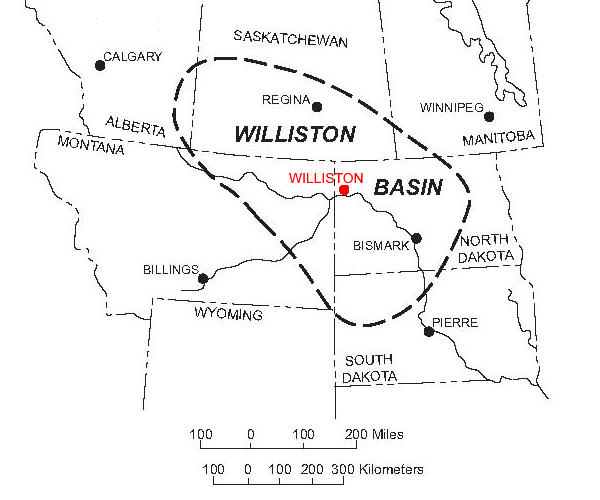
Map. Williston Basin. Williston, North Dakota Location

The Mandak League was a professional independent minor league that was not affiliated with the minor league baseball. The Mandak League member teams often paid players better than affiliated minor league teams. Some league players left minor league baseball and played for teams in the Mandak League. In the era, a player in the lower-level minor leagues earned approximately $150 per month, while Mandak League salaries in the era may have started at about $275 per month, with some players earning up to $900 per month. The league was also an integrated league, with many former negro leagues players on team rosters.

With 2,550 fans in attendance at home on May 29, 1954, Williston defeated the Brandon Greys by the score of 5–4. Williston's John Chalfont hit a sacrifice fly that drove in teammate Ron Martin with the winning run in the 11th inning. Lloyd Gearhart of the Oilers had four hits and a home run in the contest.

On August 20, 1954, Oiler player Dewey Williams was attacked by two men on the Williston's Main Street and was stabbed in his chest and abdomen, nearly losing his life. Williams was hospitalized under 24–hour police guard and was in serious condition before ultimately recovering. One of the attackers, a laborer drifter named Paul Jackson, was arrested, plead guilty to the assault and was sentenced to one year in the state penitentiary. Williams and Jackson had known each other and had a previous altercation in Toledo, Ohio after Williams had played a minor league game there. Williams played in four Mandak League seasons. A native of North Carolina, Williams eventually married and settled in Williston, living the remainder of his life in the community. He worked part time for the Williston Parks and Recreation Board umpiring baseball games, before retiring in 1982.

In their first season of play, the Williston Oilers placed third in the Manitoba-Dakota League regular season standings. Managed by Bert Shepard, the Oilers ended the 1954 regular season with a record of 28–40, finishing 11.5 games behind the first place Minot Mallards. In the four–team playoffs, the Brandon Greys defeated Williston 4 games to 3 in the first round.

Oiler manager Bert Shephard was an amputee, and was the first major league amputee player, pitching in one game in 1945. Shephard had his right leg amputated after his fighter plane was shot down during World War II in May 1944. The left–handed pitcher taught himself to walk and eventually to pitch again with an artificial leg while a prisoner in the German POW camp Stalag IX C(b) in Meiningen. On August 31, 1945, Shepard received the Distinguished Flying Cross and the Air Medal for his service in World War II in between games of a doubleheader for his Washington Senators. General Omar Bradley presented his medals in the ceremony at Griffith Stadium.

In the 1955 season, the Mandak League continued play, with the Bismarck Barons and Dickinson Packers, teams joining the league, replacing the Brandon and Carman, as the returning Minot Mallards and Williston Oilers remained in the league.

In 1955, the Oilers finished the regular season in second place in the four-team Mandak League and lost in the first round of the four-team playoffs. Williston ended the regular season with a record of 41–37, to place second in the Manitoba–Dakota League regular season. Playing under manager Roy Weatherly, the Oilers finished 4.0 games behind the first place Bismarck Barons. In the Playoffs, the Willison Oilers were defeated by Minot 4 games to 3 in the first round, ending their season.

In 1956, Madak League teams also played some games against teams from the Western Canadian Baseball League. The Williston Oilers won both the Mandak League regular season pennant and overall league championship in the 1956 season. The Oilers finished in first place with a 49–29 record, playing the season under managers Dee Moore and Preston Elkins. Williston finished 2.0 games ahead of the second place Bismarck Barons in the regular season standings. In the first round of the four–team playoffs, the Dickinson Packers were defeated by Williston 4 games to 3. In the playoff final, the Oilers defeated Minot in six games to claim the league championship.

On September 7, 1956, Willison won game six of the finals to win the Mandak League championship series 4 games to 2. Williston pitcher Jack Sanoff was the winner as Williston defeated Minot 7–3 to capture the Mandak League title in six games. Sanoff pitched a three-hitter and hit a homer run, triple and single, with 5 RBI in the clinching game.

1957 was the final season of the Mandak League, as the Brandon Greys returned to the league, replacing the Dickinson Packers franchise. The Oilers placed third in the Mandak League standings, playing the season under returning manager Preston Elkins. With a 34–37 record, Williston tied with Brandon for third place, 3.5 games behind the first place Bismarck Barons in a close race. The playoffs were not the usual four–team playoffs. Instead, the league president placed Bismarck and Minot, the top two regular season finishers, directly into the finals, which were ended due to poor weather with Minot up 2 games to 1.

The Mandak League folded after the 1957 season. Williston continued hosting independent minor league for the next two seasons, with roster, record and league information unknown for both seasons. Willison reportedly played the 1958 season as members of the Western Canada League and the 1959 season as members of the Can–Am League.

== The ballpark ==
The Williston Oilers hosted home minor league games at Ardean Aafedt Stadium. The ballpark is still in use today. The ballpark has undergone numerous upgrades and has hosted three youth baseball Babe Ruth League World Series. Constructed in 1950, Ardean Aafedt Stadium is named for a local baseball founder. Ardean Aafeldt Stadium is located within Davidson Park at 1002 11th Street W in Williston, North Dakota.

== Timeline ==
Year(s)	# Yrs.	Team	Level	League	Ballpark
1954–1957	4	Williston Oilers	Independent	Manitoba-Dakota League	Ardean Aafedt Stadium

== Year–by–year records ==
Year	Record	Finish	Manager	Playoffs/Notes
1954	28–40	3rd	Bert Shepard	Lost in first round
1955	41–37	2nd	Roy Weatherly	Lost in first round
1956	49–29	1st	Dee Moore / Preston Elkins	Won pennant League champions
1957	34–37	3rd (tie)	Preston Elikins	Did not qualify

== Notable alumni ==
- Jerry Adair (1957)
- Lloyd Gearhart (1954)
- Al Gettel (1957)
- Phil Haugstad (1955)
- Bobby Hogue (1955)
- Don Lee (1959)
- Joe Lutz (1954)
- Al Lyons (1956)
- Dee Moore (1956, MGR)
- Bert Shepard (1954, MGR)
- Harry Taylor (1954)
- Fred Vaughn (1955)
- Roy Weatherly (1954; 1955, MGR; 1956–1957)
- Dewey Williams (1954-1955, 1957)

== See also ==
- Williston Oilers players
