= Hub City Hotshots =

American amateur baseball club

- Logo

Information
- League: Expedition League (Lewis Division)
- Location: Aberdeen, South Dakota
- Ballpark: Fossum Field
- Founded: 2018; 8 years ago
- Folded: 2020; 6 years ago
- Nickname: Hotshots
- Colors: Red and Black

The Hub City Hotshots were an amateur baseball club located in Aberdeen, South Dakota. They were formed in 2018. The Hot Shots were a part of the Expedition League and were in the Lewis Division. In their two seasons, they had gone 51–73.

Record By Year

Year	W	L
2018	29	34
2019	22	39

== Suspended Operations ==
On September 4, 2019, Expedition League President, Steve Wagner, announced that they would suspend operations for the 2020 season. Also, the Aberdeen Parks and Recreation Board announced that they would be terminating the contract with the Hot Shots for the use of Fossum Field and its concessions.
