= Ira Rush =

American architect

Ira L. Rush
- Born: June 14, 1890; Bushnell, Illinois
- Died: May 9, 1949 (aged 58) near Surrey, North Dakota
- Occupation: Architect

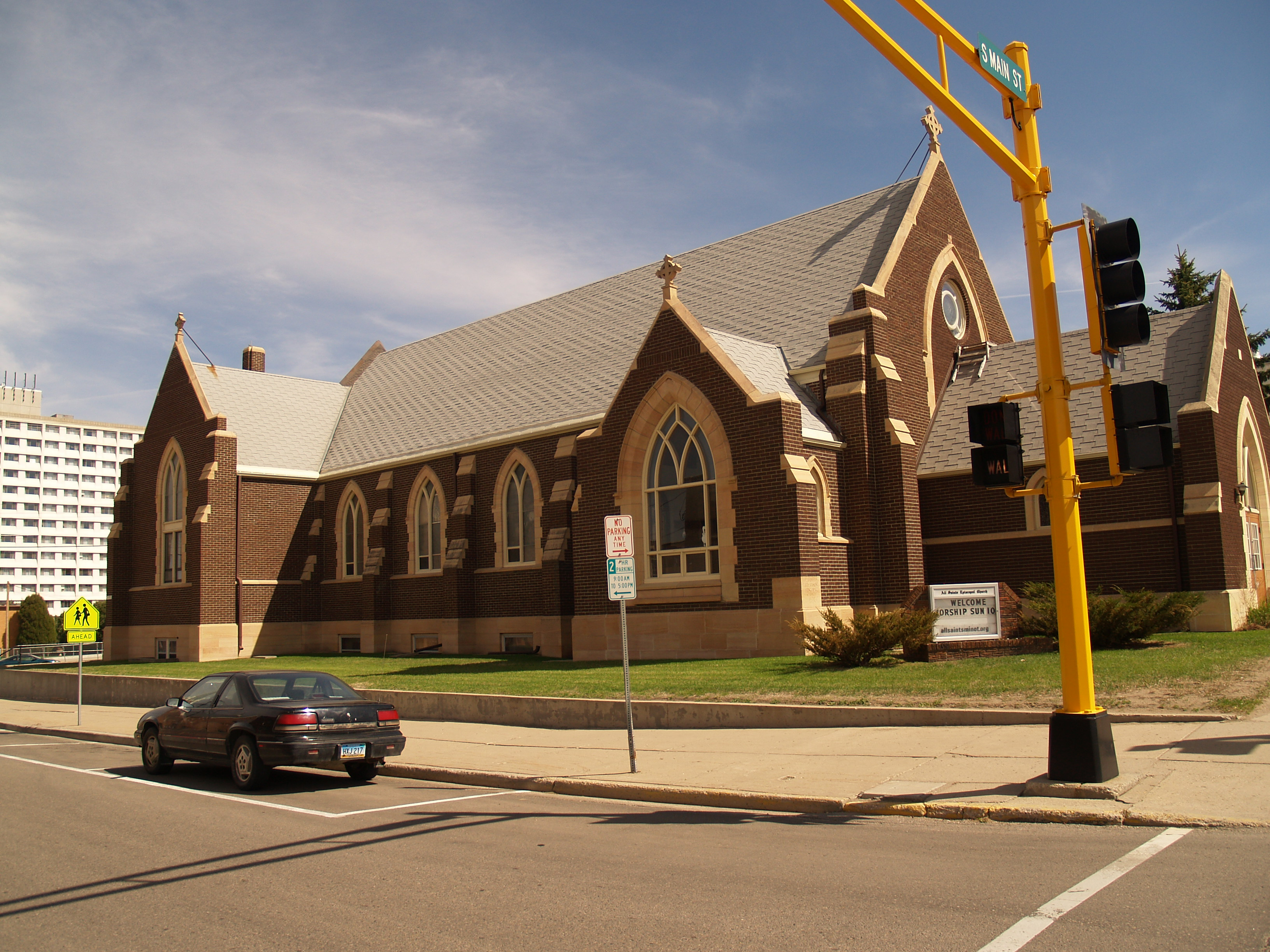
All Saints' Episcopal Church in Minot, designed by Rush and completed in 1921.

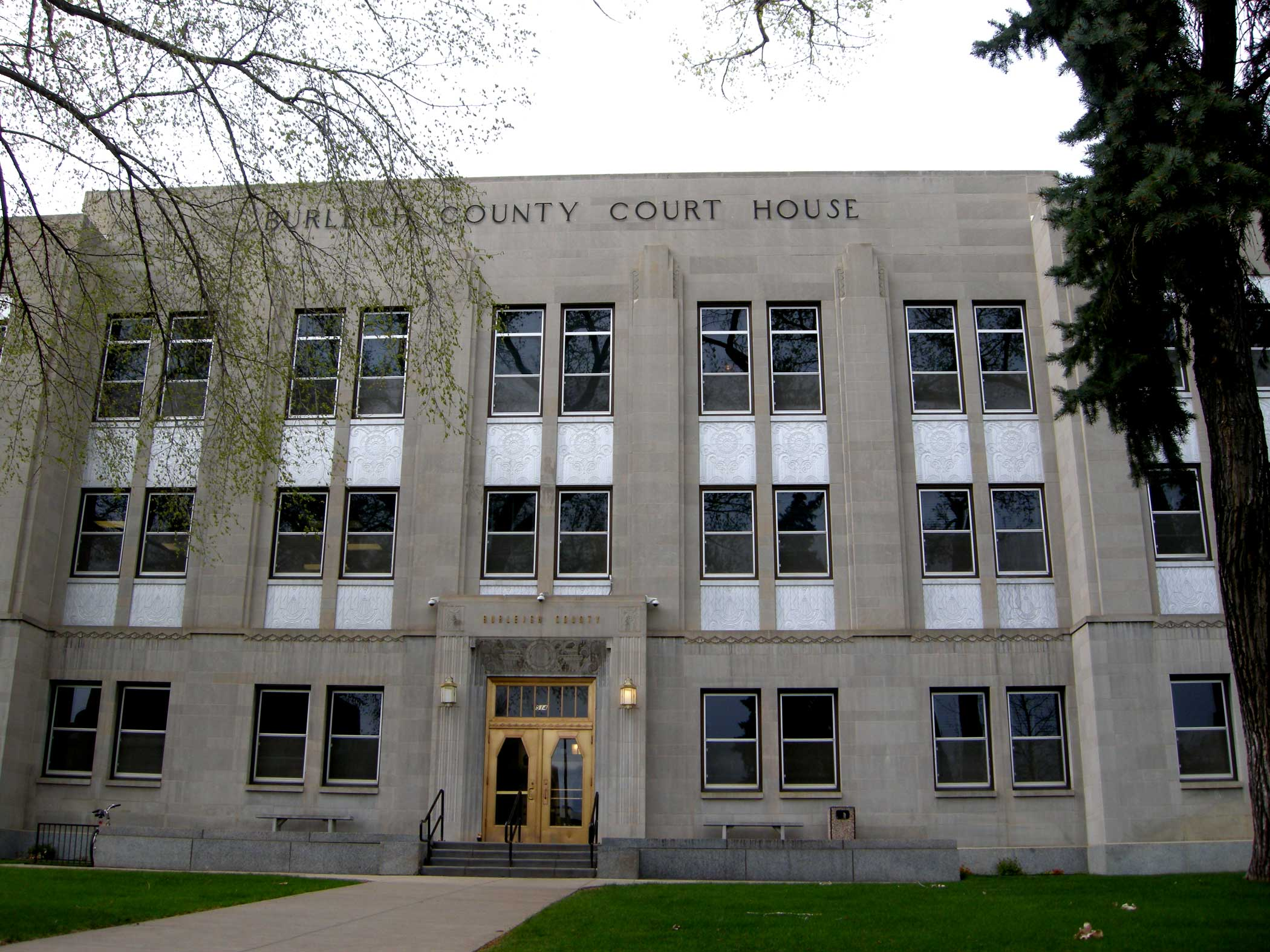
The Burleigh County Courthouse in Bismarck, completed in 1931.

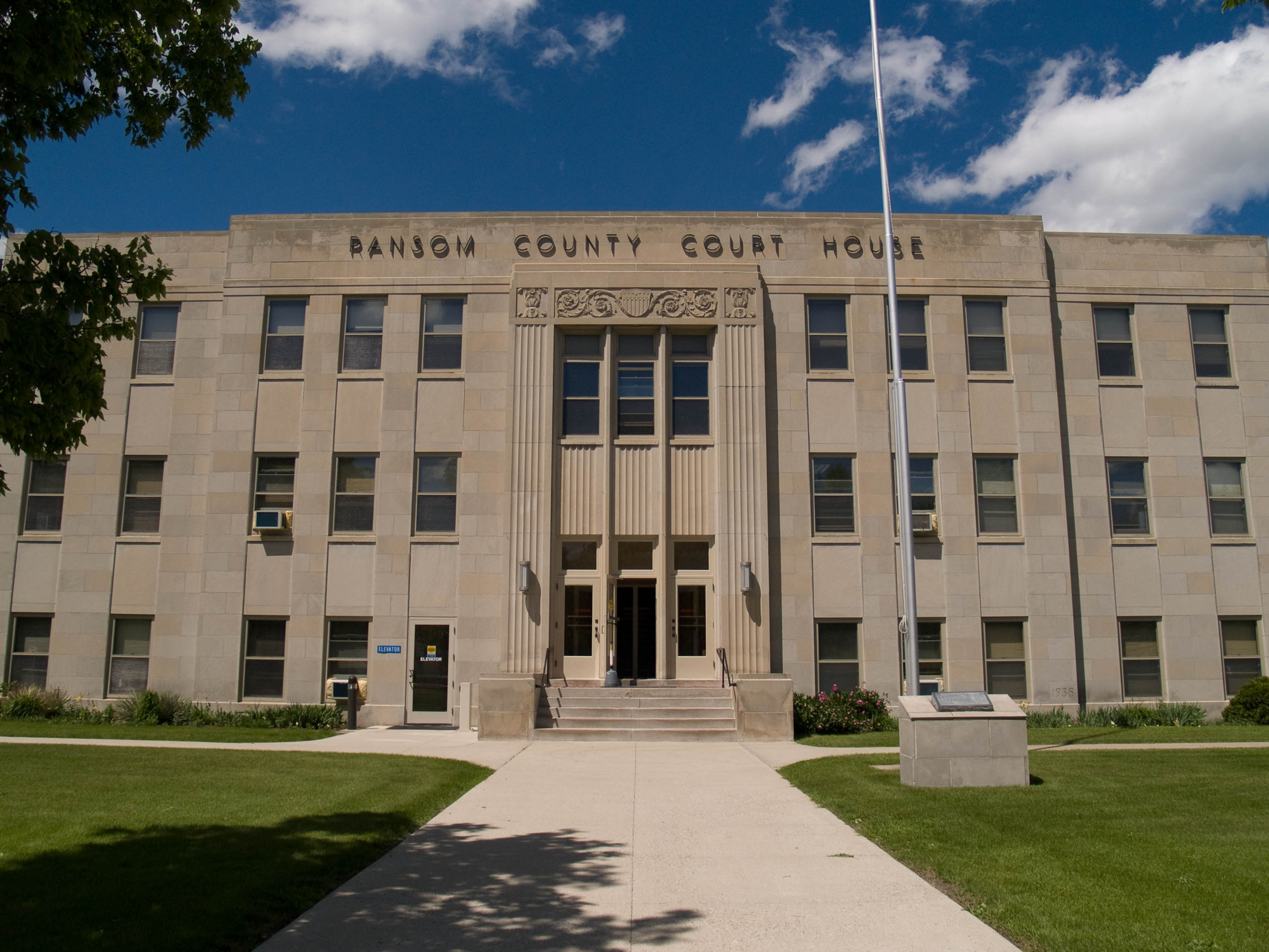
The Ransom County Courthouse in Lisbon, completed in 1938.

Ira L. Rush (1890-1949) was an American architect in practice in Minot, North Dakota from 1915 until his death in 1949.

== Life and career ==
Ira Leon Rush was born June 14, 1890, in Bushnell, Illinois to John T. Rush and Ida Mae (Aten) Rush. He was raised in Minot, where he attended the local schools, graduating from Minot High School in 1909. He worked as an architectural drafter until enrolling in the University of Minnesota in 1910, but left the university after a year to return to work. In 1912 he resumed his education at the University of Illinois, graduating in 1915 with a BS in architectural engineering. He then returned to Minot where he opened his own office as an architect. Rush practiced architecture in Minot for over thirty years, and won several design competitions for courthouses.

== Personal life and death ==
Rush was married in 1917 to Eula Margaret Brooks of Urbana, Illinois. They had two children: Dorothy, born in 1918, and Ira Leon Jr., born in 1919. Rush died in the early morning of May 9, 1949 in an auto accident near Surrey, east of Minot.

== Legacy ==
In 1950 Ira L. Rush Jr. graduated from the University of Minnesota and returned to Minot, where he operated his father's architectural office under his own name into the 1970s.

A number of his works survive and are listed on the National Register of Historic Places.

== Notable works include ==
- All Saints' Episcopal Church, 301 Main St S, Minot, North Dakota (1920–21)
- Adams County Courthouse, 600 Adams Ave, Hettinger, North Dakota (1928–29, NRHP 1985)
- Burleigh County Courthouse, E Thayer Ave, Bismarck, North Dakota (1930–31, NRHP 1985)
- Dickinson City Hall (former), 25 2nd Ave W, Dickinson, North Dakota (1930)
- Klinefelter Hall, (Note: A contributing resource to the Dickinson State Normal School Campus District, NRHP-listed in 1997.) Dickinson State University, Dickinson, North Dakota (1931)
- Corbett Field, 1124 E Burdick Expy, Minot, North Dakota (1935–37)
- Ransom County Courthouse, Fifth Ave W, Lisbon, North Dakota (1937–38, NRHP 1985)
- Sheridan County Courthouse, 215 E Second St, McClusky, North Dakota (1938–40, NRHP 1985)
- Minot High School addition, 215 1st St SE, Minot, North Dakota (1940)
