= Dickinson Packers =

- 1955–1956; Dickinson, North Dakota

Minor league affiliations
- Class: Independent (1955–1956)
- League: Manitoba-Dakota League (1955–1956)

Major league affiliations
- Team: None

Minor league titles
- League titles (0): None
- Conference titles (0): None
- Wild card berths (2): 1955; 1956

Team data
- Name: Dickinson Packers (1955–1956)
- Ballpark: Dakota Community Bank & Trust Ballpark (1955–1956)

The Dickinson Packers were a minor league baseball team based in Dickinson, North Dakota. The Packers played as members of the Independent level Manitoba-Dakota League in 1955 and 1956, reaching the league finals in 1955.

Dickinson hosted home minor league games at the ballpark known today as Dakota Community Bank & Trust Ballpark.

== History ==
Minor league baseball began in Dickinson, North Dakota in 1955, when the Dickinson "Packers" began play as members of the four-team, independent level Manitoba-Dakota League, also known as the Mandak League. The Bismarck Barons, Minot Mallards and Williston Oilers teams joined Dickinson in league play.

As a professional independent league not affiliated with the minor league baseball, Mandak League teams often paid players better than other minor league teams. Some players left minor league baseball affiliated teams and played for teams in independent leagues like the Mandak League. A player in the lower-level minor leagues earned about $150 per month, while Mandak League salaries in the era may have started at about $275 per month, with some players earning up to $900 per month. The league was also an integrated league, with many former negro leagues players on team rosters.

The Dickinson team was also referred to as the "Queen City Packers."

In 1955, the Packers finished the regular season in last place in the four-team league, but advanced to the finals in the four-team playoffs. Dickinson ended the regular season with a record of 30–48, to place fourth in the Manitoba–Dakota League regular season, finishing 13.0 games behind the first place Bismarck Barons. In the Playoffs, the Dickinson Packers defeated Bismarck 4 games to 1 in the first round, before being swept in four games by the Minot Mallards in the championship finals. The Packers were managed in 1955 by Ron Bowen.

In 1956, Madak League teams also played some games against teams from the Western Canadian Baseball League.

In their final season of play, the 1956 Dickinson Packers again finished last in the regular season standings. The Packers finished in fourth place with a 30–46 record, playing the season under manager Bill Rose. Dickinson finished 11.0 games behind the first place Williston Oilers in the regular season standings. In the first round of the four-team Manitoba–Dakota League playoffs, the Packers were defeated by Williston 4 games to 3. Former major league players Jerry Fahr, Rocky Krsnich and Garland Lawing played for the Packers in 1956.

The Dickinson Packers franchise folded from the Mandak League after the 1955 season. Dickinson has not hosted another minor league team.

== The ballpark ==
The name of the home ballpark for the Dickinson Packers is unknown. The Packers played at the site of today's Dakota Community Bank & Trust Ballpark. The site first hosted baseball in 1940 and has been in continual operation as a ballpark, undergoing major restoration and renovations in 2020. The ballpark is located at 240 2nd Street NE in Dickinson.

== Timeline ==
Year(s)	# Yrs.	Team	Level	League
1955–1956	2	Dickinson Packers	Independent	Manitoba-Dakota League

== Year–by–year records ==
Year	Record	Finish	Manager	Playoffs/Notes
1955	30–48	4th	Ron Bowen	Lost in finals
1956	30–46	4th	Bill Rose	Lost in 1st round

== Notable alumni ==
- Jerry Fahr (1956)
- Rocky Krsnich (1956)
- Garland Lawing (1956)

== See also ==
- Dickinson Packers players
