= Cowboy Field (Texas) =

Sports venue in Coppell, Texas, US

Coordinates: 32.975222°N 97.002029°W

Cowboy Field (a.k.a. "The Snake Pit") at the Coppell ISD Sports Complex is located in Coppell, Texas. It has been the home of the TCL Coppell Copperheads since 2004. It is also the home of the Coppell High School Cowboys baseball team.
