= Southern Minny Stars =

- 1996–1999; Austin, Minnesota

Minor league affiliations
- Class: Collegiate summer (1998–1999); Independent (1996–1997)
- League: Northwoods League (1998–1999); Prairie League (1996–1997)
- Division: South Division (1998–1999); Southern Division (1997)

Minor league titles
- Division titles: 1997
- First-half titles: 1997

Team data
- Colors: Blue, green, white, black
- Ballpark: Marcusen Park

The Southern Minny Stars were an American baseball team that played in the Prairie League from 1996 to 1997 and the Northwoods League from 1998 to 1999. They were created when the Minneapolis Loons moved from Minneapolis, Minnesota after the 1995 season. Their home games were played at Marcusen Park in Austin, Minnesota. Josh Willingham and Juan Berenguer both played for the Stars.

After the 1999 season, the Stars moved to Minot, North Dakota to become the Minot Greenheads.

== History ==
=== Prairie League (1996–1997) ===
The team's history begins with the Minneapolis Loons of the Prairie League. After being locked out of their home park, Siebert Field, for nonpayment of rent; the team was bought by a pair of Rochester businessmen, Dick Jensch and Joe Kardock looking to move the team to their city. After being unable to secure a lease at Mayo Field, the owners moved the team to nearby Austin, Minnesota, and renamed them the Southern Minny Stars. Jensch and Kardock owned 60% of the team; the other 40% was owned by Greg Olson, Tom Glavine, Steve Avery, and John Smoltz.

The team planned a number of promotions to bring fans into the ballpark, including giveaways of a new Ford automobile and a trip to the Caribbean, opportunities for fans to dunk the manager in a dunk tank, and a visit by the San Diego Chicken for a July 23 game against Minot. Marcusen Park was also refurbished, adding picnic areas along the foul lines and 600 bleacher seats.

The Stars began their first season with a walk-off win against the Aberdeen Pheasants. They finished the year 34–45, 20.5 games behind the league-leading Pheasants.

In early 1997, Chad Yale became majority owner of the Stars, using settlement money after he was nearly killed by an explosion after a train derailment near his Burlington, North Dakota home. While recovering at Ramsey County Hospital in St. Paul, Yale became close friends with then-manager of the Minneapolis Loons Greg Olson, who later convinced him to buy into the Stars. Yale was the youngest majority owner in professional sports. The 1997 Stars finished with a record of 42-24-1 and won the Southern Division of the Prairie League, but were eliminated in the first round of the playoffs by the Minot Mallards. After the 1997 season, the Prairie League folded, leaving the Stars without a league.

=== Northwoods League (1998–1999) ===
The Stars, along with former Prairie League cities Grand Forks, North Dakota and Brainerd, Minnesota, joined the collegiate summer Northwoods League for the 1998 season. Stars shareholders had to raise over $100,000 to clear accumulated debts from the team's Prairie League years before joining the Northwoods League. The team played two years in the Northwoods League, never winning more than a third of their games. The Stars were the smallest market in the Northwoods League, and financial issues forced the team to cease operations after the 1999 season. The Northwoods League then moved the team to Minot, North Dakota, where they became the Minot Greenheads.
