= Sheridan County Courthouse (North Dakota) =

- U.S. National Register of Historic Places
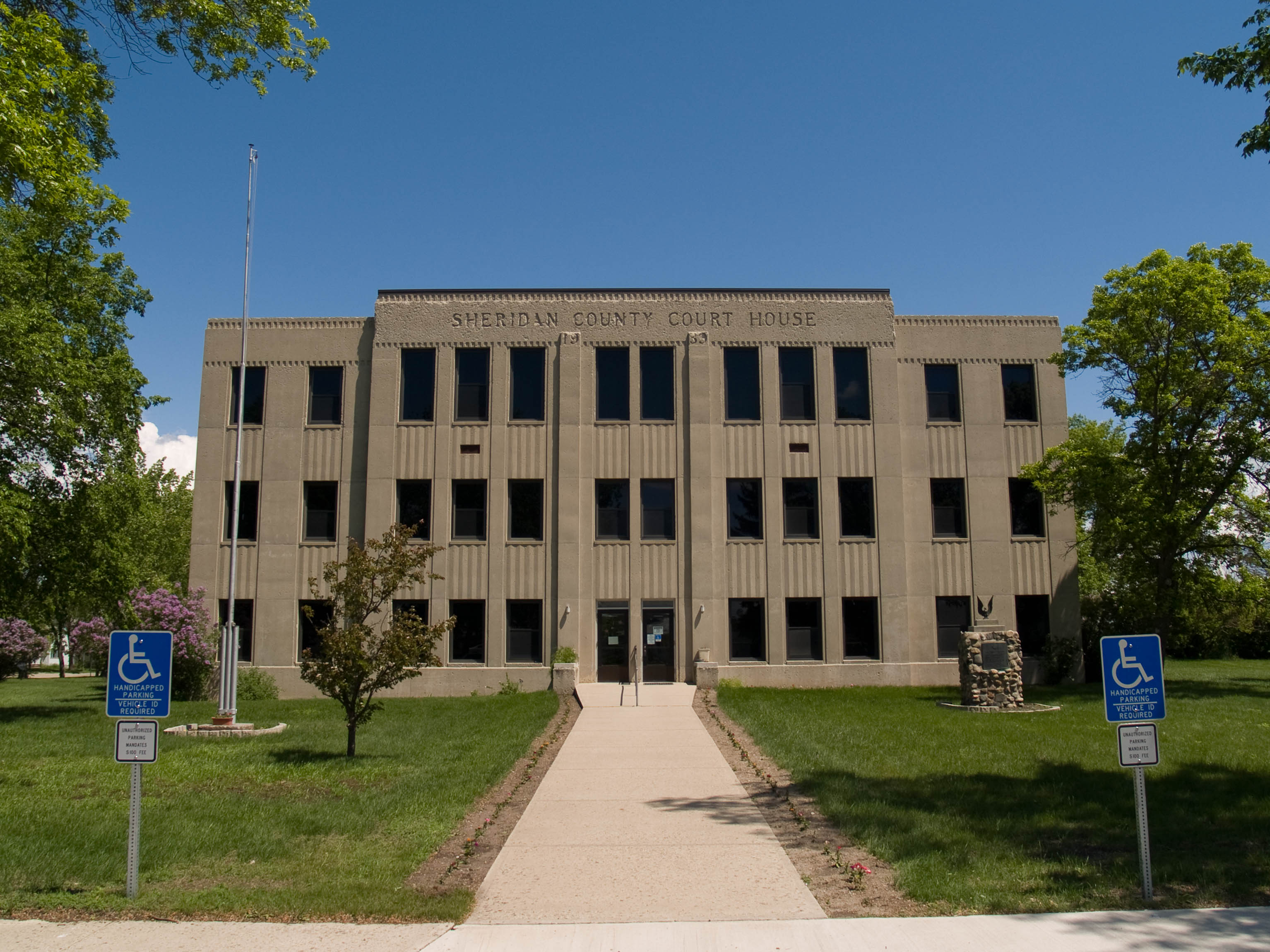

- Location within North Dakota Location within the United States
- Interactive map showing the location of Sheridan County Courthouse
- Location: 215 E. Second St., McClusky, North Dakota
- Coordinates: 47°29′4″N 100°26′25″W
- Area: 1.6 acres (0.65 ha)
- Built: 1938
- Built by: Schwarts, P.H.
- Architect: Rush, Ira
- Architectural style: Art Deco
- MPS: North Dakota County Courthouses TR
- NRHP reference No.: 85002990
- Added to NRHP: November 25, 1985

The Sheridan County Courthouse in McClusky, North Dakota, United States, was designed in the Art Deco style by architect Ira Rush. It was built in 1938 and was listed on the National Register of Historic Places in 1985.

It is a four-story 52-by-88-foot (16 m × 27 m) steel-reinforced concrete building. It was argued to be significant for "providing a stabilizing influence upon political activities on the local and county levels" as the investment in a substantial building would reduce or eliminate rivalry for towns to seize the county seat.

It was one of numerous North Dakota courthouses studied in 1985.
