= Minot Why Nots =

The Minot Why Nots were a minor league baseball team based in Minot, North Dakota, United States that played in the Northern League in 1917.
