= Adams County Courthouse (North Dakota) =

- U.S. National Register of Historic Places
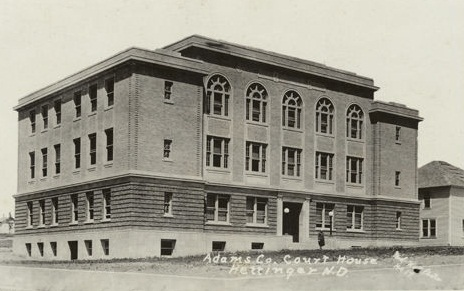
- Adams County Courthouse, c. 1930

- Location within North Dakota Location within the United States
- Location: 600 Adams Ave., Hettinger, North Dakota
- Coordinates: 46°0′5″N 102°38′4″W
- Area: less than one acre
- Built: 1928
- Built by: Fred R. Comb
- Architect: Rush, Ira
- Architectural style: Art Deco, Federalist Revival
- MPS: North Dakota County Courthouses TR
- NRHP reference No.: 85002977
- Added to NRHP: November 14, 1985

The Adams County Courthouse is a three-story brick courthouse building in Hettinger, North Dakota. Built in 1928, it was designed by Ira Rush, an architect who won competitions for design of several other courthouses in the state. The design of this one had elements of Art Deco, but appears to have been limited by budget to a more economical design.

There was a wood-frame courthouse and a sheriff's house east of the location from 1907; this building was built in 1928 and those buildings were removed by the 1960s. It was built by contractor Fred R. Comb.
