= Fossum Field =

Baseball park in South Dakota, U.S.

- Interactive map of Fossum Field
- Location: 3834 8th Ave Ne; Aberdeen, South Dakota 57401
- Coordinates: 45.47811°N 98.434874°W
- Capacity: 2,500

Fossum Field is a baseball park located in Aberdeen, South Dakota. It is the home to several baseball teams including Northern State University and the Aberdeen Smittys. Formerly, it was the home to the Hub City Hotshots until they suspended operations in 2019 and Presentation College, which folded in 2023. It seats 2,500. It features a full press box, bullpens, indoor restrooms, batting cages, picnic tables, and a full sized field for practice to the north.

== Renovations ==
The outfield fence was replaced in 2011.

A fenced-in party area was added in 2018 as well as fresh paint in the concessions, dugouts, and bathrooms.
