= Jordan De Jong =

American baseball player (born 1979)

- Pitcher
- Born: April 12, 1979 (age 46); Orange City, Iowa, U.S.
- Batted: Right Threw: Right

MLB debut
- June 6, 2007, for the Toronto Blue Jays

Last MLB appearance
- July 7, 2007, for the Toronto Blue Jays

MLB statistics
- Win–loss record: 0–0
- Earned run average: 8.00
- Strikeouts: 7
- Stats at Baseball Reference

Teams
- Toronto Blue Jays (2007)

Jordan Jay De Jong (born April 12, 1979) is an American former professional baseball relief pitcher. De Jong appeared in six games for the Toronto Blue Jays of Major League Baseball in 2007. He became a free agent at the end of the 2008 season, following an ankle injury and three ensuing surgeries.

He is the cousin of Major League pitcher Chase De Jong.
