= Minot Mallards =

- 1917–1997; (1917, 1923, 1950–1962, 1995–1997); Minot, North Dakota

Minor league affiliations
- Class: Class D (1917, 1923, 1950–1957); Class C (1958–1960, 1962); Independent (1995–1997)
- League: Northern League (1917); North Dakota League (1923); Manitoba-Dakota League (1950–1957); Northern League (1958–1960, 1962); Prairie League (1995–1997)

Major league affiliations
- Team: Cleveland Indians (1958–1960); Kansas City Athletics (1962)

Minor league titles
- League titles (7): 1923; 1952; 1953; 1954; 1955; 1996; 1997

Team data
- Name: Minot Why Nots (1917); Minot Magicians (1923); Minot Mallards (1950–1962, 1995–1997)
- Ballpark: Corbett Field (1950–1962, 1995–1997)

The Minot Mallards were a minor league baseball team based in Minot, North Dakota. Earlier Minot teams preceded the Mallards and played as members of the 1917 Northern League and 1923 North Dakota League. Beginning play in 1950, the Mallards played as members of the Manitoba-Dakota League (1950–1957), Northern League (1958–1960, 1962) and Prairie League (1995–1997), winning seven league championships in their history.

The Mallards hosted home minor league home games at Corbett Field. The Mallards played as a minor league affiliate of the Cleveland Indians from 1958 to 1960 and the Kansas City Athletics in 1962.

Baseball Hall of Fame member Satchel Paige pitched for the 1950 Minot Mallards.

== History ==
=== Northern League 1917/North Dakota League 1923 ===
Minor league baseball in Minot, North Dakota began with a partial season in 1917. The 1917 Minot Why Nots joined the Class D level Northern League. The Northern League folded on July 4, 1917. The Minot Why Nots finished the 1917 season with a record of 19–23, placing third in the Northern League under manager George Brautigam.

The 1923 Minot Magicians became charter members of the four–team 1923 Class D level North Dakota League. The Minot Magicians were the North Dakota League Champions in 1923. The Minot Magicians ended the season with a record of 48–21, placing first in the North Dakota State League standings, finishing 15.0 games ahead of the second place Jamestown Jimkotas, 17.5 games ahead of the third place New Rockford/Valley City team and 21.5 games ahead of the Bismarck Capitals. The Magicians won both halves of the league season and were declared champions, playing under manager Herb Hester. The North Dakota League permanently folded after the 1923 season.

=== Manitoba–Dakota League 1950–1957 ===
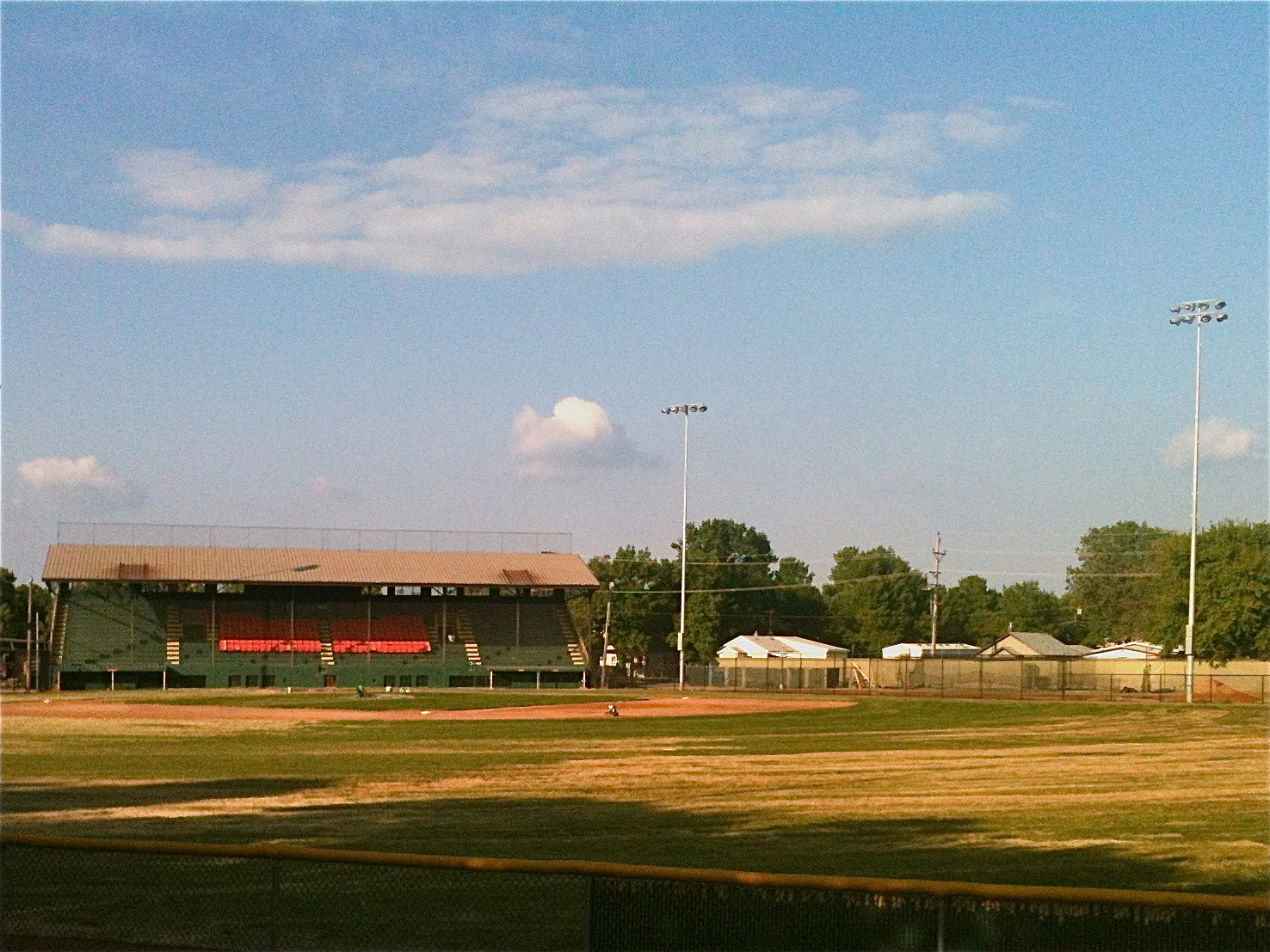
(2012) Corbett Field was the home stadium of the Minot Mallards. Minot, North Dakota.

In 1950, the Minot Mallards began play as charter members of the Independent level Manitoba-Dakota League, nicknamed the MANDAK league. The Mallards moniker was submitted by Minot native Bonnie Rae Miller, in a fan based team-naming contest. The "Mallards" moniker beat out the "Kernels" and the "Plainsmen" in the naming contest. The integrated Manitoba–Dakota League had many African–American and Latino players on their rosters, with many former Negro leagues players playing in the league. Many of the players had been deemed old to be given roster spots by the integrating major leagues. In their first season of play, the Minot Mallards ended the 1950 season with a record of 24–24, placing third in the MANDAK standings under manager Bill Lefebvre. In the Playoffs, the Winnipeg Buffaloes defeated Minot 3 games to 0. Baseball Hall of Fame member Satchel Paige pitched two games for the 1950, Minot Mallards.

After arriving late to a 1950 game due to a bus accident, the Minot catcher had a discussion with the starting pitcher Satchel Paige, "When the National Anthem ended, I asked Paige if he would like to warm up. He replied that he been warmed up since 1936 when he pitched for the Bismarck, North Dakota team."

The Minot Mallards of the Manitoba–Dakota League ended the 1951 season with a record of 32–32. The Mallards placed third in the Manitoba–Dakota League regular season standings. Otto Huber was the 1951 manager. In the Playoffs, the Winnipeg Buffaloes again defeated Minot 4 games to 3.

The 1952 Minot Mallards won the Manitoba–Dakota League Championship, their first of four consecutive championships under manager Clifton McLean. The Minot Mallards ended the 1952 season with a record of 32–22 to finish first in the Manitoba–Dakota League regular season standings. In the Playoffs, the Minot Mallards swept the Brandon Greys in 4 games. In the 1952 Finals, Minot defeated the Carman Cardinals 4 games to 1.

In 1953, the Minot Mallards defended their Manitoba–Dakota League Championship. Minot ended the 1953 regular season with a record of 43–31, placing first in the Manitoba–Dakota League standings under manager Ed Albosta. In the Playoffs, Minot defeated the Brandon Greys 2 games to 0 in a Tiebreaker. Minot then defeated the Winnipeg Royals 4 games to 2. In the 1953 Finals, the Minot Mallards defeated the Brandon Greys 4 games to 2.

Minot continued their Championship run in 1954, as the Mallards won their third consecutive Manitoba–Dakota League championship. The Mallards placed first in the regular season with a record of 47–21, playing under manager Clifton McLean. In the Playoffs, the Minot Mallards defeated the Carman Cardinals 4 games to 3. In the 1954 Finals, Minot defeated the Brandon Greys 4 games to 2.

The 1955 season saw the Minot Mallards capture their fourth consecutive Manitoba–Dakota League championship. The Mallards ended the 1955 regular season with a record of 38–40, placing third in the standings. Clifton McLean served again as manager. In the 1955 Playoffs, the Minot Mallards defeated the Williston Oilers 4 games to 2. In the Finals, Minot swept the Dickinson Packers in 4 games.

Minot lost in the 1956 Manitoba–Dakota League Finals. The Minot Mallards of the Manitoba–Dakota League ended the 1956 regular season with a record of 43–35, placing third in the league standings. Knowles Piercey and Hal Daugherty served as managers in 1956. In the Playoffs, the Mallards defeated the Bismarck Barons 4 games to 2. In the Finals, the Williston Oilers defeated Minot 4 games to 2.

1957 was the final season of the Manitoba–Dakota League and Minot advanced to the league Finals. With Clifton McLean returning as manager, the Mallards ended the 1957 season with a 36–35 record, placing second in the regular season standings. In the Finals, the Bismarck Barons defeated the Minot Mallards 2 games to 1, when Minot forfeited after rain cancelled two games. The Manitoba–Dakota League permanently folded after the 1957 season.

=== Northern League 1958–1960, 1962 ===
Minot looked to host a franchise to join the Northern League in 1958, in unison with the Bismarck-Mandan Pards. The Northern League was looking to expand to ten teams and wished to add both franchises. But the eight–team Northern League saw their Wausau franchise fold, leaving them with seven teams. The Northern League wasn't able to successfully create a nine–team schedule after Wausau folded. The league was only able to add one more team and Minot was chosen over a Bismarck-Mandan franchise to be the eighth team.

After the folding of the Manitoba-Dakota League, the Minot Mallards continued play, becoming members of the 1958 Class C level Northern League as an affiliate of the Cleveland Indians. The Minot Mallards ended the 1958 Northern League regular season with a record of 67–55, placing fourth in the standings. In the playoffs, the Fargo-Moorhead Twins defeated Minot in a one–game playoff. Ken Landenberger was the 1958 manager. Playing home games at Corbett Field, season attendance was 34,355, an average of 563 per game.

The 1959 Minot Mallards continued play as a Cleveland Indians affiliate, playing again under manager Ken Landenberger. Minot finished the 1959 regular season with a record of 63–60, placing fourth in the Northern League. In the Playoffs, the Aberdeen Pheasants defeated Minot. Season Attendance at Corbett Field was 29,337.

In the 1960 season, the Mallards placed fourth in the Northern League regular season standings, ending the season with a 62–62 record. Walt Novick was the 1960 manager. In the playoffs, the Duluth-Superior Dukes defeated the Minot Mallards. Corbett Field season attendance was 25,376, an average of 409 per game. The Minot franchise folded from the Northern League after the 1960 season, only to return in 1962.

After not fielding a team in 1961, the Minot Mallards returned to play in the 1962 Class C Northern League. As an affiliate of the Kansas City Athletics, Minot placed eighth and last in the league. The Minot Mallards ended the Northern League season with a record of 44–80 under manager Grady Wilson. Season attendance was 41,052 at Corbett Field. The Minot franchise folded after the 1962 season.

=== Prairie League 1995–1997 ===
In 1995, the Minot Mallards moniker was reborn as a tribute to the former teams, as Minot became members of the Independent level Prairie League. The new franchise was owned by Don and Sharon Ziegler. The 1995 Minot Mallards ended the Prairie League regular season with a record of 24–47, placing eighth in the Prairie League. Mark Hebbeler was the 1995 manager. Returning to play at Corbett Field, season home attendance was 31,666, an average of 892 per game.

The 1996 Minot Mallards were Prairie League champions. The Mallards ended the Prairie League regular season with a 54–26 record, placing third in the regular season standings, playing the season under manager Mitch Zwolensky. In the playoffs, the Minot Mallards defeated the Aberdeen Pheasants 2 games to 0. In the Finals, Minot defeated the Grand Forks Varmints 3 games to 1 to win the championship. Corbett Field season attendance was 28,361, an average of 709.

1997 was the final season for the Prairie League and the Minot Mallards. The Mallards defended their Prairie League championship, playing under managers Mitch Zwolensky, Alan Riffle and Jason Felice. Minot ended the 1997 regular season with a record of 43–28, placing second in the league's Southern Division. In the playoffs, Minot defeated the Southern Minny Stars 2 games to 0. In the Finals, the Mallards defeated the Regina Cyclones 3 games to 0 to win their second consecutive championship. Season attendance at Corbett Field was 24,984, an average of 735 in 34 home dates. The Prairie League folded after the 1997 season due to financial difficulties.

== The ballpark ==
Beginning in 1950, the Minot Mallards minor league teams were noted to have played home games at Corbett Field. Also known as Municipal Ball Park (1958–1962), the ballpark was constructed in 1937. The ballpark had a zig zag outfield wall when the Mallards began play in 1950. The ballpark had a capacity of 3,500; 2,500 (1995) and dimensions of (Left, Center, Right): 315–365–420–360–310. Still in use today, the ballpark is located off Front Street SE, close to Roosevelt Park and the Zoo. The location is 1220 4th Avenue SE, (Burdick Expressway East), Minot, North Dakota.

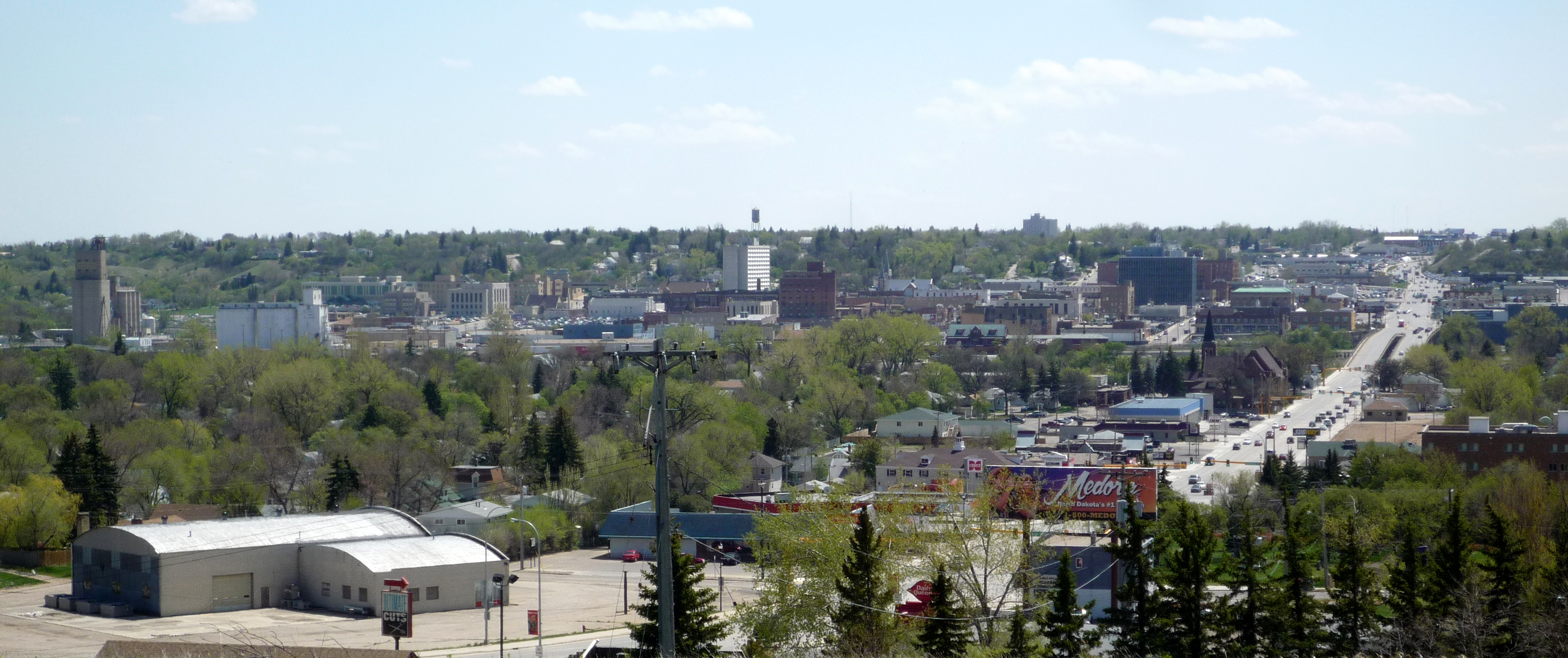
(2009) Minot, North Dakota

== Timeline ==
Year(s)	# Yrs.	Team	Level	League
1919	1	Minot Why Nots	Class D	Northern League
1923	1	Minot Magicians	Class D	North Dakota League
1950–1957	8	Minot Mallards	Independent	Manitoba-Dakota League
1958–1960, 1962	4	Minot Mallards	Class C	Northern League
1995–1997	3	Minot Mallards	Independent	Prairie League

== Year–by–year Northern League records ==
Year	Record	Finish	Manager	Playoffs
1958	67–55	4th	Ken Landenberger	Lost in 1st round
1959	63–60	4th	Ken Landenberger	Lost in 1st round
1960	62–62	4th	Walt Novick	Lost in 1st round
1962	44–80	8th	Grady Wilson	Did not qualify

== Notable alumni ==
- Satchel Paige (1950) Inducted Baseball Hall of Fame, 1971
- Ed Albosta (1952–1953, MGR)
- Max Alvis (1960)
- John Andre (1957)
- Darrell Brown (1996)
- Willard Brown (1957)
- Paul Casanova (1960)
- Mike de la Hoz (1958)
- Vallie Eaves (1951)
- Jerry Fosnow (1960)
- Walter Lee Gibbons (1955–1957)
- Brian Giles (1996)
- Jimmy Grant (1951)
- Chuck Hiller (1958)
- Otto Huber (1951)
- Hal Jones (1959)
- Ken Landenberger (1958–1959, MGR)
- Jim Lawrence (1958–1959)
- Bill Lefebvre (1950, MGR)
- Ramón Lopez (1959–1960)
- Lou Lombardo (1953)
- Pete Lovrich (1962)
- Joe Mack (baseball) (1951)
- Tony Martinez (1960)
- Walter McCoy
- Bill Oster (1956–1957)
- Mickey Rocco (1953)
- Hal Schacker (1951)
- Sonny Siebert (1959)
- Larry Stahl (1962)
- Pete Taylor (1956)
- Ron Taylor (1958)
- Bill Upton (1957)
- Bob Whitcher (1953)
- Billy Williams (1958–1959)
- Dewey Williams (1955–1957)

== See also ==
- Minot Mallards players
- Corbett Field, formerly known as the Minot Municipal Ballpark
- Sports in Minot, North Dakota
