= Prairie League =

Independent baseball league in the 1990s

- Most recent season or competition: 1997 Prairie League season
- Sport: Baseball
- Founded: 1995
- Folded: 1997
- No. of teams: 12 (Total)
- Country: United States, Canada
- Last champion: Minot Mallards (1997)
- Most titles: Minot Mallards (2)

The Prairie League was an independent baseball league that existed from 1995 to 1997. It was based in the Canadian prairie provinces of Saskatchewan and Manitoba and the U.S. states of North Dakota, South Dakota, Minnesota and Wisconsin.

The eight-team league was founded in 1995 following the demise of the North Central League. Three teams migrated from the North Central League (Minneapolis, Regina, and Saskatoon), and five new teams formed (Aberdeen, Brandon, Dakota, Minot, and Moose Jaw). In the first season, the teams were divided into two four-team divisions by country. The U.S. winners and the Canadian winners competed in best-of-five championship, with the Regina Cyclones winning 3-1.

In 1996, the league expanded, adding teams in Brainerd, Minnesota, Grand Forks, North Dakota, and Green Bay, Wisconsin. The Minneapolis Loons relocated to Austin, Minnesota, becoming the Southern Minny Stars. With more American team than Canadian teams, the league was reorganized into Northern and Southern divisions, and the Minot Mallards won the 1996 championship.

The (Bismarck) Dakota Rattlers folded before the 1997 season, and the Green Bay Sultans left for the Heartland League. Minot once again won the league championship, but the league ceased operations after the 1997 season due to financial troubles.

== Cities represented ==
Locations of Prairie League teams
- Aberdeen, SD: Aberdeen Pheasants 1995–1997
- Austin, MN: Southern Minny Stars 1996–1997
- Bismarck, ND: Dakota Rattlers 1995–1996
- Brainerd, MN: Brainerd Bobcats 1997
- Brandon, MB: Brandon Grey Owls 1995–1996; West Manitoba Wranglers 1997
- Grand Forks, ND: Grand Forks Varmints 1996–1997
- Green Bay, WI: Green Bay Sultans 1996
- Minneapolis, MN: Minneapolis Loons 1995
- Minot, ND: Minot Mallards 1995–1997
- Moose Jaw, SK: Moose Jaw Diamond Dogs 1995–1997
- Regina, SK: Regina Cyclones 1995–1997
- Saskatoon, SK: Saskatoon Riot (1995); Smokin' Guns (1996); Stallions (1997)

== Notable league alumni ==
- Chris Coste
- Kerry Ligtenberg
- Shawn Wooten
- Curt Ford
