= Coal City station =

Railway station in Coal City, Illinois, US

Coal City

General information
- Location: Coal City, Illinois
- Coordinates: 41°17′7″N 88°16′51″W
- System: Former AT&SF passenger rail station
- Owner: BNSF
- Platforms: 1 side platform
- Tracks: 2

Construction
- Structure type: at-grade

Former services
Preceding station	Atchison, Topeka and Santa Fe Railway	Following station
Gorman toward Los Angeles	Main Line	Lorenzo toward Chicago
Location

Coal City station was an Atchison, Topeka and Santa Fe Railway station in Coal City, Illinois. It served trains on the "Doodlebug" spur line from Peoria and Pekin, Illinois to Chicago. The train was often run with one car, dubbed the "dinky", and made its last run on 1955. The station house is one story and made of brick.
