= Jermaine Clark =

American baseball player (born 1976)

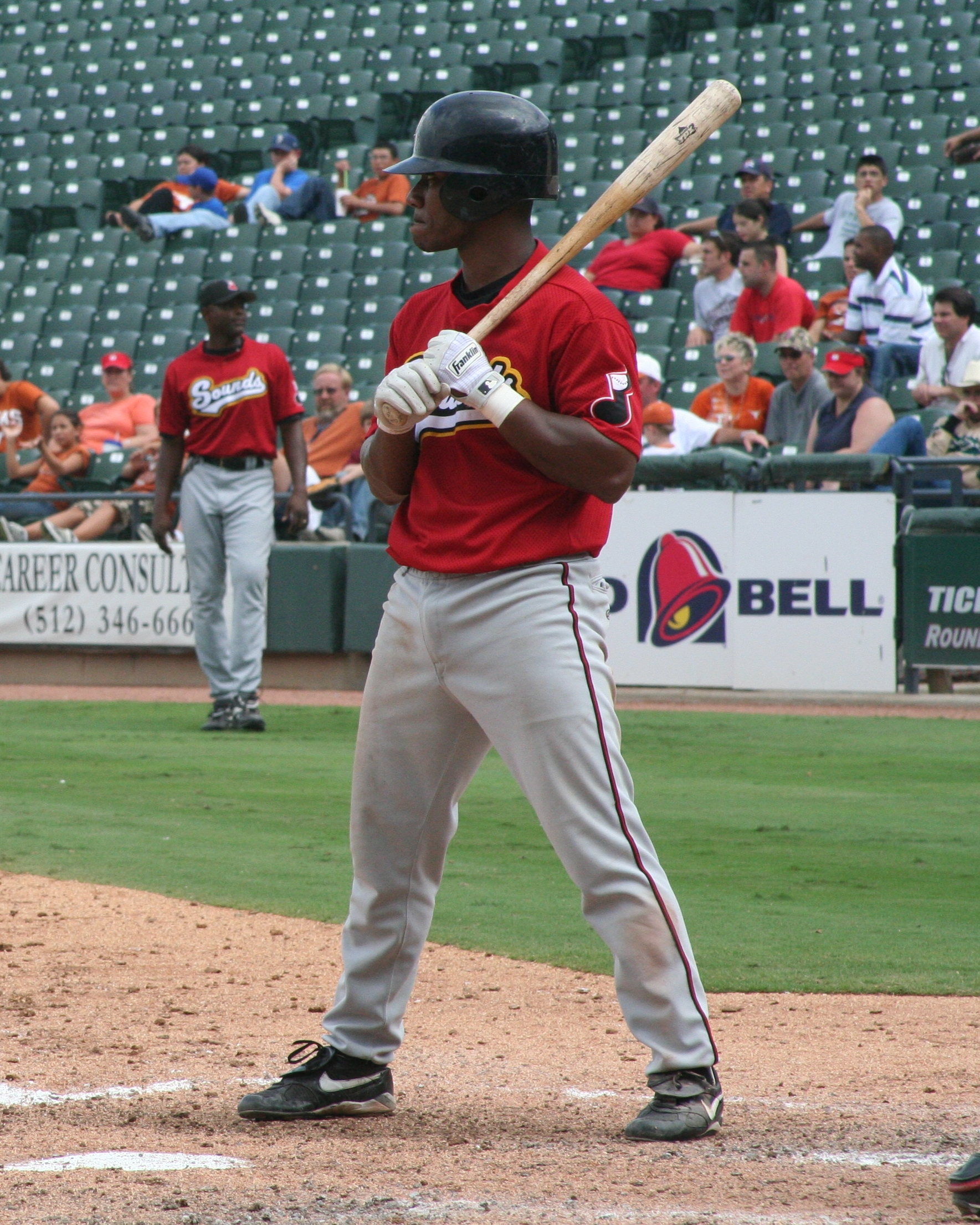
- Outfielder
- Born: September 29, 1976 (age 49); Berkeley, California, U.S.
- Batted: Left Threw: Right

MLB debut
- April 3, 2001, for the Detroit Tigers

Last MLB appearance
- May 24, 2005, for the Oakland Athletics

MLB statistics
- Batting average: .154
- Runs batted in: 9
- Stolen bases: 3
- Stats at Baseball Reference

Teams
- Detroit Tigers (2001); Texas Rangers (2003); San Diego Padres (2003); Cincinnati Reds (2004); Oakland Athletics (2005)

Jermaine Marcel Clark (born September 29, 1976) is an American former Major League Baseball player who played for several teams between 2001 and 2005.

== Amateur career ==
A native of Berkeley, California, Clark attended Will C. Wood High School and the University of San Francisco. In 1995, he played collegiate summer baseball with the Kenosha Kroakers of the Northwoods League (becoming the first Kroaker alumnus to play in the majors), and in 1996 for the Chatham A's of the Cape Cod Baseball League, where he was a league all-star, helped lead the team to the league championship, and was named co-MVP of the league's playoffs. Clark was selected by the Seattle Mariners in the 5th round of the 1997 MLB draft.

== Professional career ==
His major league debut came on April 3, 2001, with the Detroit Tigers. In his major league career, he also played for the Texas Rangers, San Diego Padres, Cincinnati Reds, and Oakland Athletics. He played second base and all three outfield positions in his 46-game career, but he only managed to hit .154 during his time in the big leagues.

== Scouting & coaching career ==
After his playing career ended, Clark has worked as a scout for the Oakland Athletics, and an assistant coach for Fresno State University's baseball team. He is currently the Northern California area scout for the Colorado Rockies.
