= Denise Stillman =

American businessman

- Born: November 28, 1971; Chicago Corners, Wisconsin, U.S.
- Died: November 7, 2018 (aged 46); Chicago, Illinois, U.S.
- Known for: Establishing the Field of Dreams baseball complex

Denise Miarecki Stillman (November 28, 1971 – November 7, 2018) was an American entrepreneur and preservationist. She was known for establishing the Field of Dreams complex in Dyersville, Iowa.

== Early life ==
Denise Marie Miarecki was born in 1971 in Chicago Corners, Wisconsin, to Gale and Wanda Miarecki, one of their four children.

Her family moved to Goose Lake in Coal City, Illinois, where she graduated from Coal City High School in 1989. She graduated from Bradley University in 1992, before earning a master's degree in Business Administration at Northwestern University's Kellogg Graduate School of Management in 1999.

== Career ==
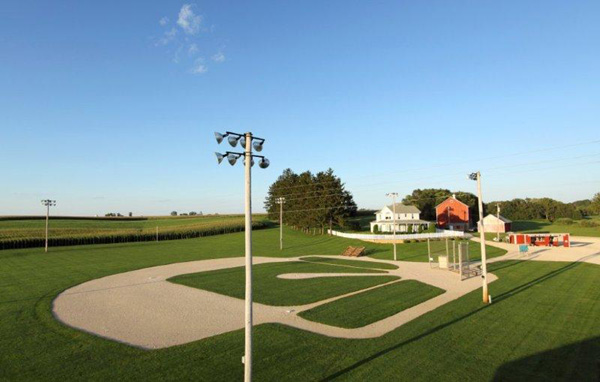
The Field of Dreams baseball field, in Dyersville, Iowa, pictured in 2012

Upon leaving school, Miarecki began an eighteen-year career in marketing. In 2012, two years after first visiting the site with her family, she purchased the baseball field in Dyersville, Iowa, featured in the 1989 movie Field of Dreams, from the Lansing family. She established the company Go The Distance Baseball and created a youth sports tournament complex—the All-Star Ballpark Heaven—with an intent to host a Major League Baseball (MLB) game at the venue. In 2021, three years after her death, the venue, which is now named Field of Dreams, hosted an MLB game between the Chicago White Sox and the New York Yankees. The game was titled MLB at Field of Dreams.

== Personal life ==
Stillman was first married to Mike Stillman. In 2016, she remarried, to Tom Mietzel. She had two children: a son and a daughter.

== Death ==
Stillman died from liver cancer in 2018, aged 46.
