= Jay Gibbons =

American baseball player (born 1977)

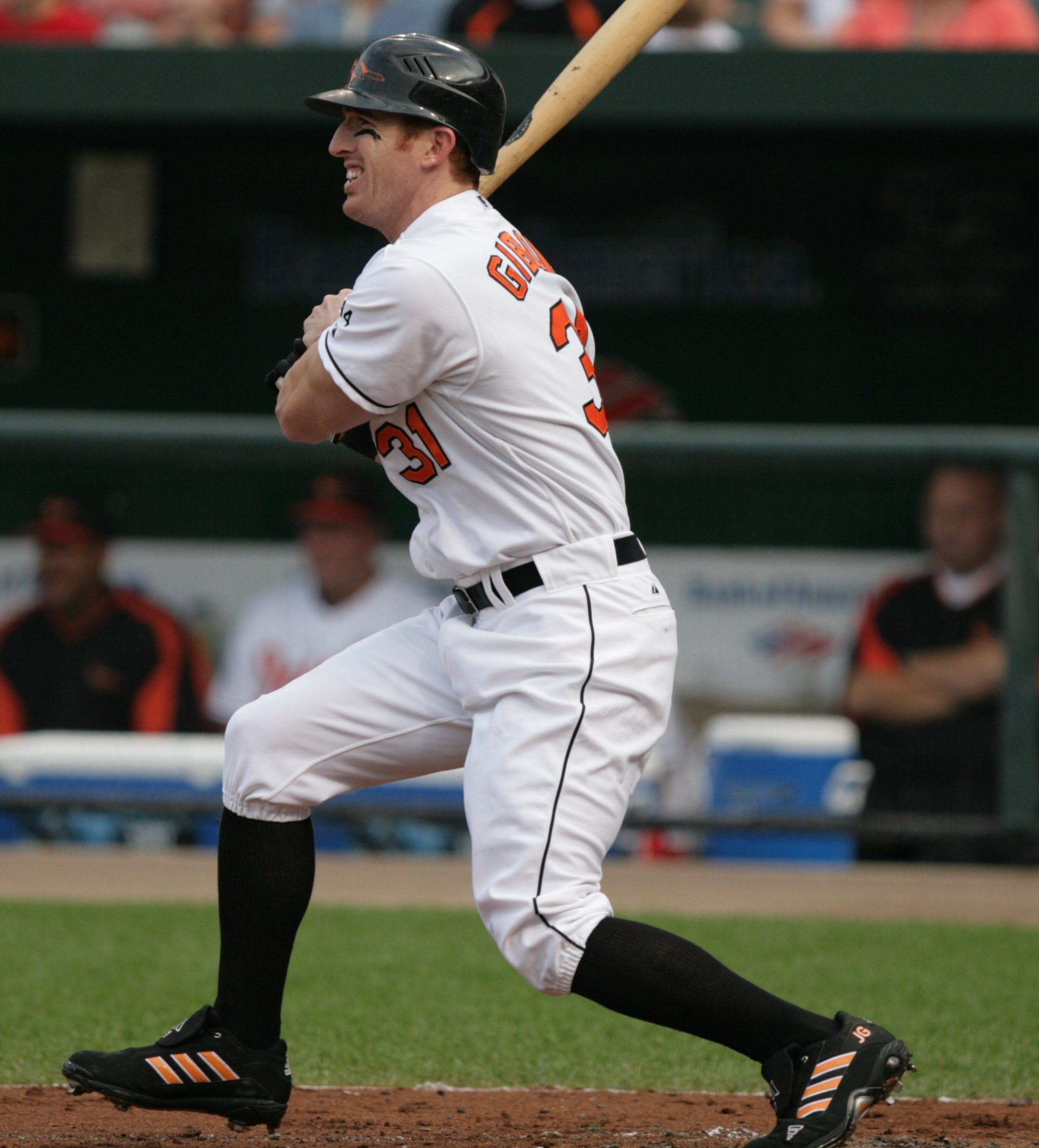
- Gibbons with the Baltimore Orioles in 2006
- Right fielder / Designated hitter
- Born: March 2, 1977 (age 49); Rochester, Michigan, U.S.
- Batted: Left Threw: Left

MLB debut
- April 6, 2001, for the Baltimore Orioles

Last MLB appearance
- June 3, 2011, for the Los Angeles Dodgers

MLB statistics
- Batting average: .260
- Home runs: 127
- Runs batted in: 427
- Stats at Baseball Reference

Teams
- Baltimore Orioles (2001–2007); Los Angeles Dodgers (2010–2011)

Jay Jonathan Gibbons (born March 2, 1977) is an American former Major League Baseball player. He played for the Baltimore Orioles and the Los Angeles Dodgers.

== Early life ==
Gibbons was born in Rochester, Michigan and attended Mayfair High School in Lakewood, California.

=== College ===
He attended California State University, Los Angeles, where he played college baseball. In the summers of 1996 and 1997, he played summer league baseball for the Manitowoc Skunks of the Northwoods League.

== Professional career ==
=== Minor leagues ===
Gibbons was selected by the Toronto Blue Jays in the 14th round, 411th overall, of the 1998 amateur draft and that season captured the Pioneer League Triple Crown with the Medicine Hat Blue Jays, hitting .397 with 19 home runs and 98 RBI. After the 2000 season, he was picked up by the Baltimore Orioles in the Rule 5 draft.

=== Baltimore Orioles ===
As a rookie for the Orioles in 2001, he hit 15 home runs before a hand injury cut short his season. The next year, he hit a career-best 28 homers. In 2003, Gibbons had another excellent season. Playing in a career-high 160 games, he established personal bests with a .277 batting average and 100 RBI and was voted Team MVP.

In 2004, Gibbons suffered multiple injuries and only played in 97 games. Because of his hobbling injuries, his numbers plummeted: his batting average was a mere .246, and he hit only 10 homers. After the 2004 season, he had LASIK eye surgery to improve his declining eyesight, which went from 20–10 to 20–35 in only a few months. He bounced back with a solid 2005 season as he hit .277 with 26 home runs and 79 RBI in 139 games.

He wore No. 25 until Rafael Palmeiro signed a contract with the Orioles in 2004. Out of respect for the older and more established Palmeiro, Jay switched to No. 31, which he wore for the rest of his time with the Orioles, even after Palmeiro left the Orioles.

==== Steroid allegations ====
On September 30, 2006, the Los Angeles Times reported that former relief pitcher Jason Grimsley, during a June 6, 2006, federal raid, told federal agents investigating steroids in baseball that Gibbons was a user of anabolic steroids. The Times reported that Gibbons was one of five names blacked out in an affidavit filed in federal court. However, on October 3, 2006, the Washington Post reported that San Francisco United States attorney Kevin Ryan said that the Los Angeles Times report contained "significant inaccuracies." Gibbons, along with the other four players named, denounced the story. However, on September 9, 2007, Sports Illustrated reported that a source close to an Orlando-based compound pharmacy alleged that Gibbons had received multiple shipments of performance-enhancing steroids and human growth hormone (HGH) between October 2003 to July 2005.

On December 13, 2007, he was cited in the Mitchell Report.

He was suspended for the first 15 games of the 2008 season on December 6, 2007, and performed so poorly in 2008 spring training that the Orioles cut him even though he was owed nearly $12 million for the last two years of his contract. The Orioles management claimed that the release was a "baseball decision" unrelated to the steroid allegations.

=== Long Island Ducks ===
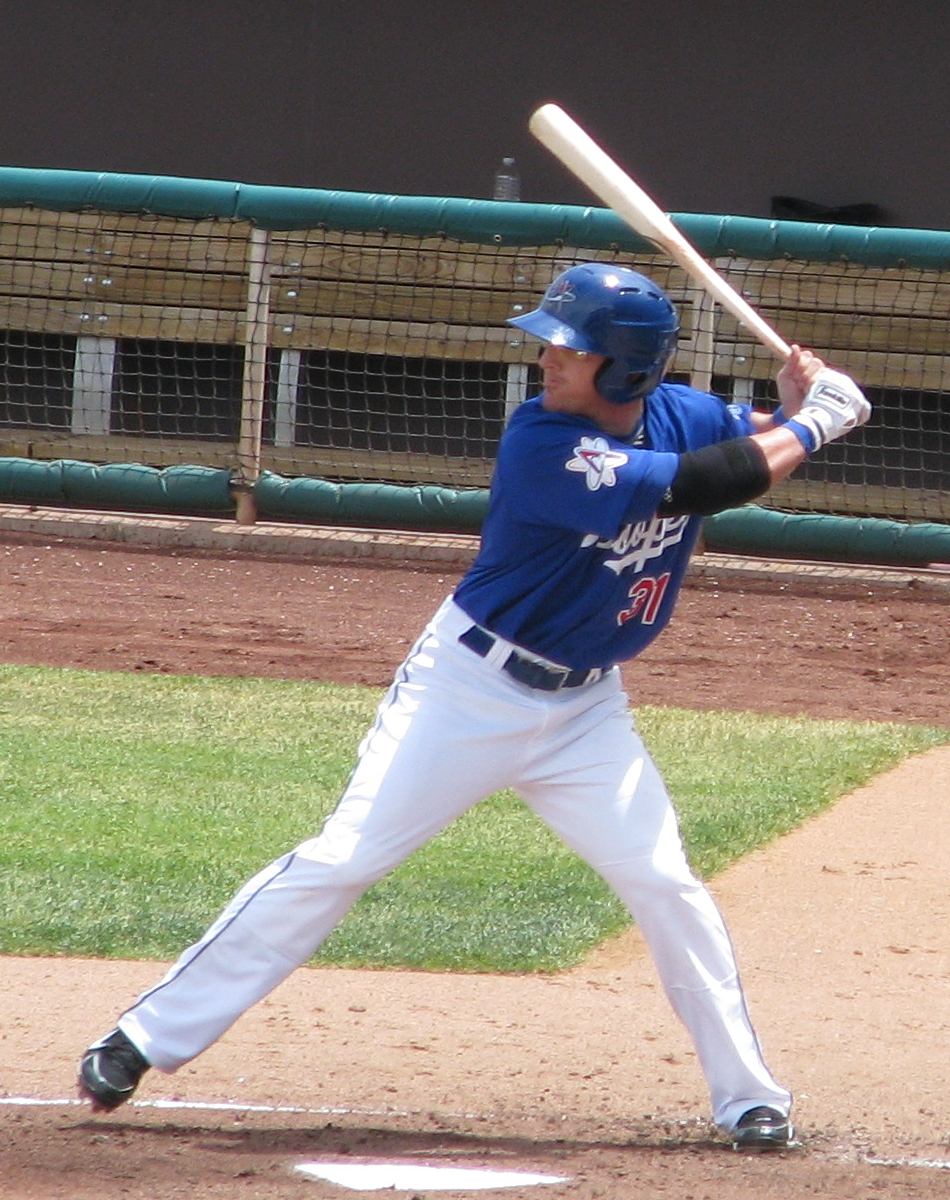
Albuquerque Isotopes v. Nashville Sounds, Isotopes Park, May 9, 2010.

On June 12, 2008, Gibbons wrote an emotional letter to all 30 MLB clubs, asking to return to baseball, promising to donate his salary to charity. The only team that gave him a chance was the independent Long Island Ducks of the Atlantic League, a team unaffiliated with MLB. He played in 27 games for the Ducks, hitting .280 with five home runs in 107 at-bats.

=== Milwaukee Brewers ===
On July 22, 2008, Gibbons signed a minor league contract with the Milwaukee Brewers and was assigned to the Double-A Huntsville Stars. Gibbons spent approximately one week at Double-A Huntsville before being promoted to Triple-A Nashville on July 27. He became a free agent after the season.

=== Florida Marlins ===
Gibbons signed a minor league contract with an invitation to spring training with the Florida Marlins on January 13, 2009. He was released by the Marlins on March 13, 2009; the Marlins stated that they did not have room on the roster for him.

=== Newark Bears ===
On May 11, 2009, Gibbons agreed to play for the Newark Bears of the Atlantic League. In 40 games he hit .233/.286/.387 with 4 home runs and 19 RBIs.

=== Los Angeles Dodgers ===
Gibbons signed a minor league contract with the Los Angeles Dodgers prior to the 2010 season. He was assigned to the Triple-A Albuquerque Isotopes to start the season and was selected to the mid-season Pacific Coast League all-star team. In 94 games with the Isotopes, he hit .347 with 19 home runs.

Gibbons was called up to the Dodgers on August 8, 2010. In the game that day against the Washington Nationals, he hit a pinch-hit RBI single. Two days later, Gibbons started in left field against the Philadelphia Phillies, finishing 3–4 with a home run and three RBI.

He appeared in 37 games with the Dodgers, getting extensive playing time after the trade of Manny Ramirez. He finished hitting .280 with five home runs and 17 RBI.

On November 4, 2010, Gibbons signed a one-year deal to remain with the Dodgers. He began to experience some vision problems while playing winter ball in Venezuela and saw some eye specialists when the problem persisted through spring training, causing him to lose his chance to be the team's regular left fielder. The problems continued into April and he began the season on the disabled list while trying out different contact lenses. He was even concerned that his career might be over. After an extended rehab assignment at AAA Albuquerque that lasted for most of April, he was activated on May 3. He appeared in 24 games, hitting .255 before he was designated for assignment on June 6. He returned to the Isotopes, where he played in 76 games the rest of the season, hitting .300 with nine home runs and 46 RBI. He became a free agent after the season.

=== Milwaukee Brewers ===
Gibbons signed a minor league contract with the Milwaukee Brewers in February 2012. He retired from baseball as an active player on July 9.

=== Coaching ===
In 2015, he became a hitting coach for the Dodgers Class-A team in the Midwest League, the Great Lakes Loons. The following season, he was promoted to the hitting coach job with the Rancho Cucamonga Quakes in the California League.

== See also ==
- List of Major League Baseball players named in the Mitchell Report
