= Dune Coast QuillBacks =

Baseball team in Michigan, United States

Information
- League: Northwoods League (Great Lakes East Division)
- Location: New Buffalo, Michigan
- Ballpark: New Buffalo High School (baseball field)
- Founded: 2026
- Ownership: Brian Williams & Tom Rowland
- Website: northwoodsleague.com/dune-coast-quillbacks/

The Dune Coast QuillBacks are a baseball team that plays in the collegiate summer Northwoods League. Based in New Buffalo, Michigan, the team will begin play in summer 2027. The team will play their home games at the New Buffalo high school baseball field.

== History ==
On May 4, 2026, the Northwoods League announced the addition of Dune Coast as an expansion team for the 2027 season. They will be playing at New Buffalo high school. Among the two owners Brian Williams & Tom Rowland. On July 31, the team announced their name, the QuillBacks.
