= ISG Field =

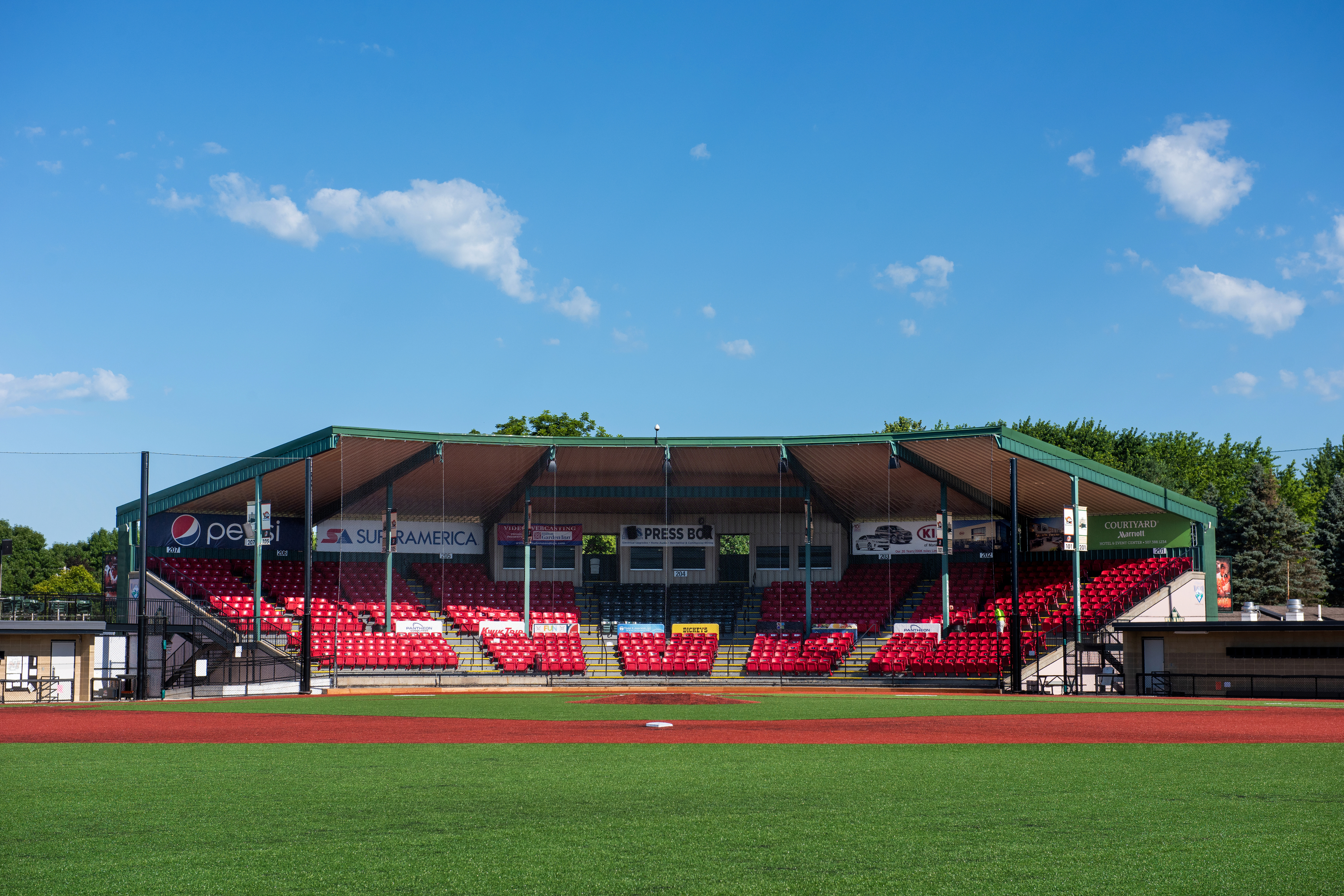
- Interactive map of ISG Field
- Former names: Franklin Rogers Park (1977–2020); Key City Park (1961–1976)
- Location: 601 Reed Street; Mankato, Minnesota 56001
- Coordinates: 44°10′12″N 93°58′33″W
- Owner: City of Mankato
- Operator: Mankato Parks and Recreation
- Capacity: 2,200
- Surface: artificial turf
- Field size: Left Field: 315 ft (96 m); Center Field: 386 ft (118 m); Right Field: 325 ft (99 m)
- Public transit: MTS

Construction
- Opened: 1961
- Renovated: 2018

Tenants
- Mankato Mets (NL) 1967–1968; Mankato MoonDogs (NWL) 1999–present Mankato Habaneros (NWL) 2024–present Bethany Lutheran College (UMAC); Mankato West High School; Loyola Catholic School

ISG Field is a stadium in Mankato, Minnesota, United States, with a capacity of 2,200. It is primarily used for baseball, and is the home field of the Mankato Moondogs (formerly the Mankato Mashers) of the Northwoods League, a collegiate summer baseball league. Bethany Lutheran College, Mankato West High School, Loyola Catholic School, and Mankato Area Youth Baseball Association also use the venue.

== History ==
The stadium was built in 1961 as Key City Park. It was renamed for local sportswriter Franklin Rogers in 1977. The first Northwoods League game at the field was played in June 1999. New additions to the park prior to 2018 included lights, a roof over the grandstand, hospitality decks down the left and right field lines, and additional seating.

Between the 2017 and 2018 MoonDogs seasons, the ballpark received $4 million in upgrades. Renovations include a fully artificial turf playing surface, new concession stand, a video board, a new hospitality deck, and other amenities. The MoonDogs played their first game at the renovated stadium on May 29, 2018.

It was reported in October 2020 that naming rights had been sold for 2021 and beyond to ISG, a Mankato firm chaired by one of the MoonDogs' owners, resulting in a name of ISG Field.
