= Dyersville Dreamers =

Amateur baseball team in Dyersville, IA

Information
- League: Northwoods League
- Location: Dyersville, Iowa
- Ballpark: Field of Dreams
- Founded: 2027
- Colors: John Deere Green
- Ownership: Chris Goodell, Ben Kapanke, Dan Kapanke, Chad Surprenant, Kyle Smith
- Management: Chris Goodell (Team President)
- Manager: TBD
- Website: northwoodsleague.com/dyersville-dreamers/

The Dyersville Dreamers is a baseball team based in Dyersville, Iowa. It is a prospective member of the Northwoods League, a collegiate summer baseball league. Dreamers home games are expected to be played at the Field of Dreams Ballpark near Dyersville, where they will operate as permanent tenant starting in 2027.

== History ==
In May 2026, the Northwoods League (NWL) announced that they would be adding an expansion team as a permanent tenant at the Field of Dreams Ballpark. “This is exactly the kind of partnership we envisioned when we started building this ballpark. The Northwoods League has a proven track record of developing great players and creating great fan experiences,” shared Tyler Daugherty, General Manager, Field of Dreams Ballpark. “Together, we think we’re going to build something really special here in Dyersville.”

== Identity ==
After the announcement of the planned team, a name-the-team contest was announced, where fans could vote online among the finalists for the team identity: Corn Dogs, Dreamers, Ghosts, Moonlighters, and Spirits.

In an event held in conjunction with the 2026 NWL All-Star Game at Field of Dreams Ballpark, Dreamers was announced as the winner. Along with the name, the team's visual identity was unveiled, with several references to the film Field of Dreams and the Dyersville region. A shade of green inspired by John Deere features prominently, and the player in the logo is shown holding Shoeless Joe Jackson's baseball bat, Black Betsy.
