= Field of Dreams (Dubuque County, Iowa) =

American baseball park built for a 1989 film

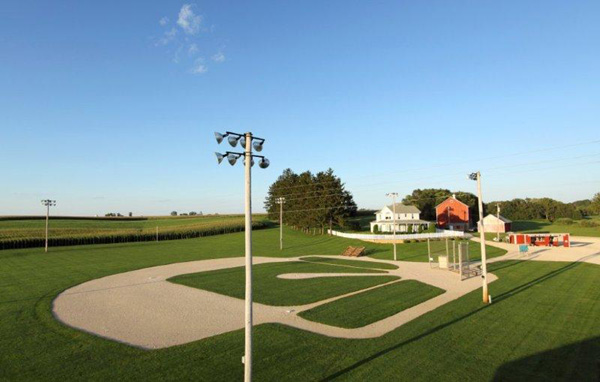
- 2012 view of the film set field, house and barn, looking east

- Location in Iowa Location in the United States
- Address: Field of Dreams Way
- Location: Dyersville, Iowa
- Coordinates: 42°29′52″N 91°03′18″W
- Owner: Go the Distance Baseball (since 2012)
- Capacity: 8,000
- Surface: Grass

Construction
- Opened: 1988; 38 years ago

Tenant
- Dyersville Dreamers (Northwoods League) beginning 2027

Field of Dreams is a baseball field and pop-culture tourist attraction built for the 1989 movie of the same name. It is located in Dyersville, Iowa, within Dubuque County.

== Site history ==
Universal Pictures built the baseball diamond in 1988 on two farms a few miles outside Dyersville, Iowa, for the 1989 film Field of Dreams. When production completed, the baseball diamond created for the movie was left behind. Most of the baseball field, including the diamond and the adjacent house, was on a farm owned by Don and Becky Lansing. Don's grandparents purchased the farm in 1906. He said the film's producers knocked on his door and asked him if he would permit the filming of a movie on his property. "They caught me totally off guard. Everything happened real fast."

Sue Riedel, a teacher in Iowa, was tasked with finding a farm that matched what the studio was looking for. "I had pictures of about 60 farms in the area," she said in 2021. "All of a sudden, I was driving around and I came up over this hill. There was this farm, the Lansing farm, and it just had this really picturesque look. I really thought it was the best property because it was set by itself. It was also totally surrounded by corn, which they really wanted."

The left and center field were on an adjacent property owned by the Ameskamp family. The field was built across the two properties because the producers wanted to place the field in a location where sunset shots would have a clear line-of-sight.

After filming completed, the Lansing family kept their portion of the field intact and added a small hut where visitors could buy souvenirs. The Ameskamp family returned their land to farming for a year, but then restored the remainder of the field and opened up their own souvenir stand. The two owners had operated separate tourist facilities and had also been at odds regarding commercialization of the site.

In 1990, Keith Rahe, a neighboring farmer, put together a baseball team dubbed the "Ghost Players" to entertain the visitors at the field. The team's presence at the field on Sunday afternoons once a month attracted thousands of additional fans to the field. In 1991 and 1992, the Upper Deck Company sponsored a celebrity game at the field. Executive producer Tony Loiacono, who later received the key to the city, brought Hall of Famers like Bob Gibson, Reggie Jackson and Bob Feller to take on Hollywood stars like Kelsey Grammer and Meat Loaf in a charity game. The two games raised over $100,000 for local charities.

A 2002 book by author Brett H. Mandel – Is This Heaven? The Magic of the Field of Dreams – chronicles the story of how the once make-believe location has been turned into a real and tangible place that beckons people from across the world. The book, which has also been translated into Japanese, "offers readers a glimpse of this slice of heaven here on Earth and shows how it continues to affect people who step between the chalk lines."

=== Rolling Roadshow ===
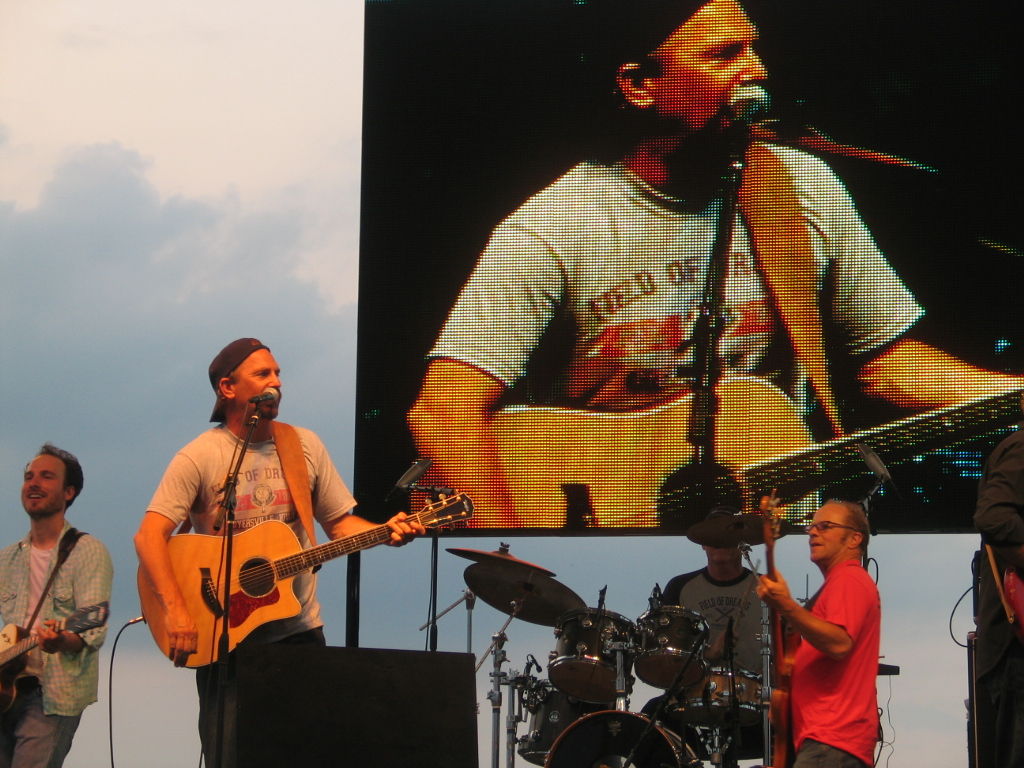
The Kevin Costner Band

On August 11, 2006, Austin, Texas' Alamo Drafthouse "Rolling Roadshow" (which screens films in locations unique to each film) showed Field of Dreams at the Field of Dreams site in Dyersville. A giant, outdoor screen was set up adjacent to the field with seating, concession, and parking along left and center field. Only the property owned by the Ameskamp family was allowed to be used for this event; the Lansing property was closed to the public. Before the screening of the film, Kevin Costner and his band (unnamed at the time, now known as Kevin Costner and Modern West) performed for two hours for the attending crowd of close to 1,000 people. Costner and his band played a selection of original songs and popular covers, including a song about Iowa that he wrote during the filming of Field of Dreams 17 years earlier.

=== Consolidation of land and Go the Distance operation ===
In August 2007, Rita Ameskamp sold the land containing her portion of the baseball field to Don and Becky Lansing – the owners of the remainder of the field. As a result, the movie site was, for the first time, entirely owned by the Lansing family. On May 13, 2010, the Lansings announced they were putting the farm used for the movie up for sale. On October 30, 2011, it was reported that a sale had been agreed upon with a private partnership called Go the Distance Baseball, founded by Denise Stillman, which has owned and preserved the movie site since December 28, 2012.

Under Go the Distance, new events have been held at the venue. The Ghost Players returned in 2013. Over Father's Day weekend 2014, the field was home to a series of events to commemorate its 25th anniversary, including an exhibition game featuring Kevin Costner, Dwier Brown and others. The events drew an estimated 12,000 fans.

Under new ownership, visitor traffic has increased from 65,000 to 100,000 visitors per year, according to Go the Distance. Additionally, in March 2018, Go the Distance began renting the house and ballfield to tourists at a cost of $2,200 per night on weekdays and $2,500 per night on weekends.

=== Additional development ===
Not long after buying the movie site, Go the Distance Baseball announced plans for a 24-field youth baseball and softball complex known as All-Star Ballpark Heaven. The project was initially intended to open in 2014, coinciding with the film's 25th anniversary, but confronted difficulties finding funding and legal action from neighboring property owners, who objected to the commercial re-zoning of the site. Additionally, the cost has ballooned from the initially proposed $38 million to more than $70 million; while the Iowa state legislature passed a tax incentive for the project, developers failed to meet deadlines to secure it.

On September 30, 2021, Go the Distance Baseball announced in a press release that Frank Thomas, member of the Major League Baseball Hall of Fame, purchased a controlling interest in Go The Distance Baseball LLC.

In September 2021, a venture named This is Heaven LLC, led by Frank Thomas and Chicago-area real estate developer Rick Heidner, purchased a controlling interest in Go the Distance Baseball, LLC. Heidner, who was an original investor in the site alongside Denise Stillman, partnered with Thomas to oversee a planned $80 million expansion including youth baseball fields, a hotel, and an RV park.

In 2023, the field was updated to have an underground stormwater system.

In 2024, after many of the proposed developments failed to materialize, Heidner and Thomas sold the property to a nonprofit group, Dyersville Events, for $27 million.

=== Northwoods League ===
In November 2025, the collegiate summer baseball Northwoods League (NWL) announced that the 2026 NWL All-Star Game would take place at the Field of Dreams site. This game took place on July 8, 2026, with the Great Lakes division all-stars defeating those from the Great Plains division 4-2.

In May 2026, the NWL announced that the site would serve as host to a permanent tenant team for the 2027 season. The Dyersville franchise launched a name-the-team contest online, with finalists being the Corn Dogs, Dreamers, Ghosts, Moonlighters, and Spirits. On July 7, 2026, in conjunction with NWL All-Star activities, the Dyersville Dreamers identity was revealed.

=== MLB at Field of Dreams ===
Major League Baseball (MLB) planned for a 2020 regular-season game to be held at a temporary facility constructed at a distance of approximately 500 ft (150 m) in the cornfields, setting the stage for the first MLB game ever played in Iowa (although some consider the Keokuk Westerns, a 19th-century professional baseball team in Keokuk, Iowa, a major league team). The contest was originally scheduled for August 13, 2020, between the Chicago White Sox and New York Yankees. Due to the COVID-19 pandemic, the game was rescheduled to August 12, 2021. The game resulted in a 9–8 win by the White Sox over the Yankees. After the game drew the highest regular-season ratings in 16 years, MLB announced it would return the following year for a contest between the Cincinnati Reds and Chicago Cubs. However, Frank Thomas later indicated that no game would be played in 2023 because of construction, although there is a possibility of MLB resuming the series in future seasons.

On August 13, 2026, the Minnesota Twins and the Philadelphia Phillies played on the field, the first MLB game there in four years. The game was streamed live on Netflix as part of their new partnership with the MLB.

== Dimensions and capacity ==
The original movie set ballpark is 281 feet (85.6 m) to left field, 314 feet (95.7 m) to center and 262 feet (79.9 m) to right field, with 300 ft (91.4 m) to the power alleys. With additional temporary bleachers, the venue held nearly 6,000 spectators for the 2013 Team of Dreams celebrity game.

== Gallery ==
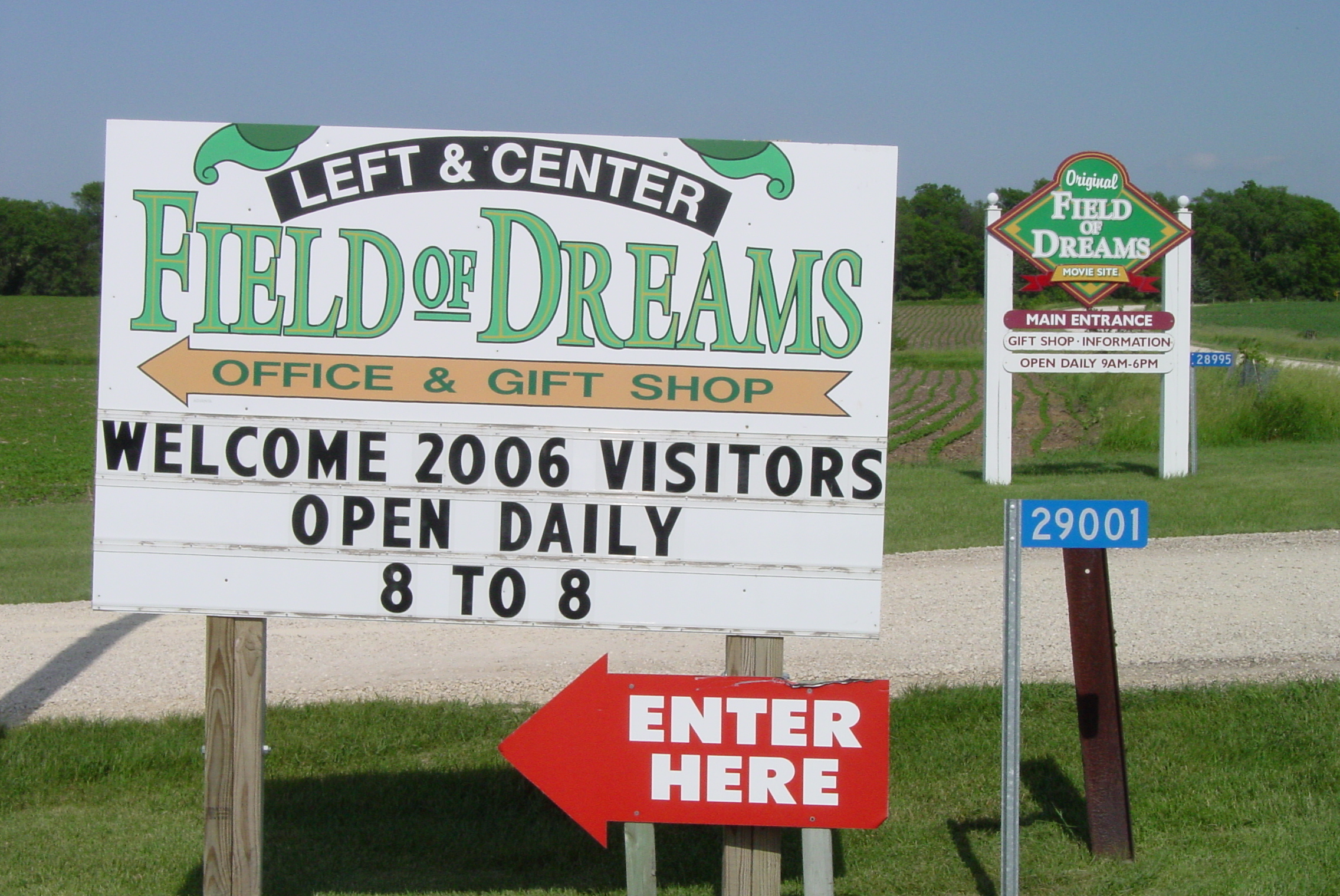
Two signs, two entrances, shortly before the 2007 merging of the two properties

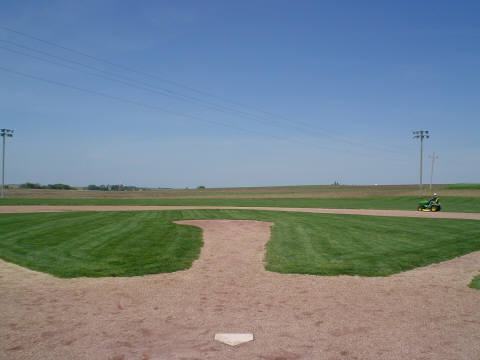
View from behind home plate, 2009

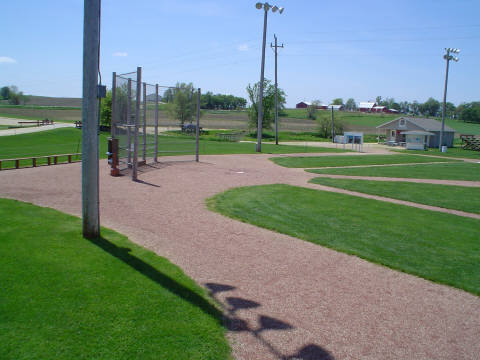
Home plate

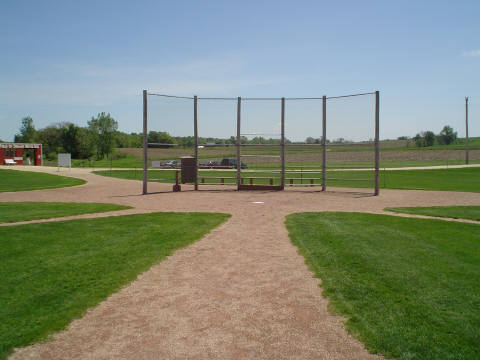
View from the pitcher's mound, 2009

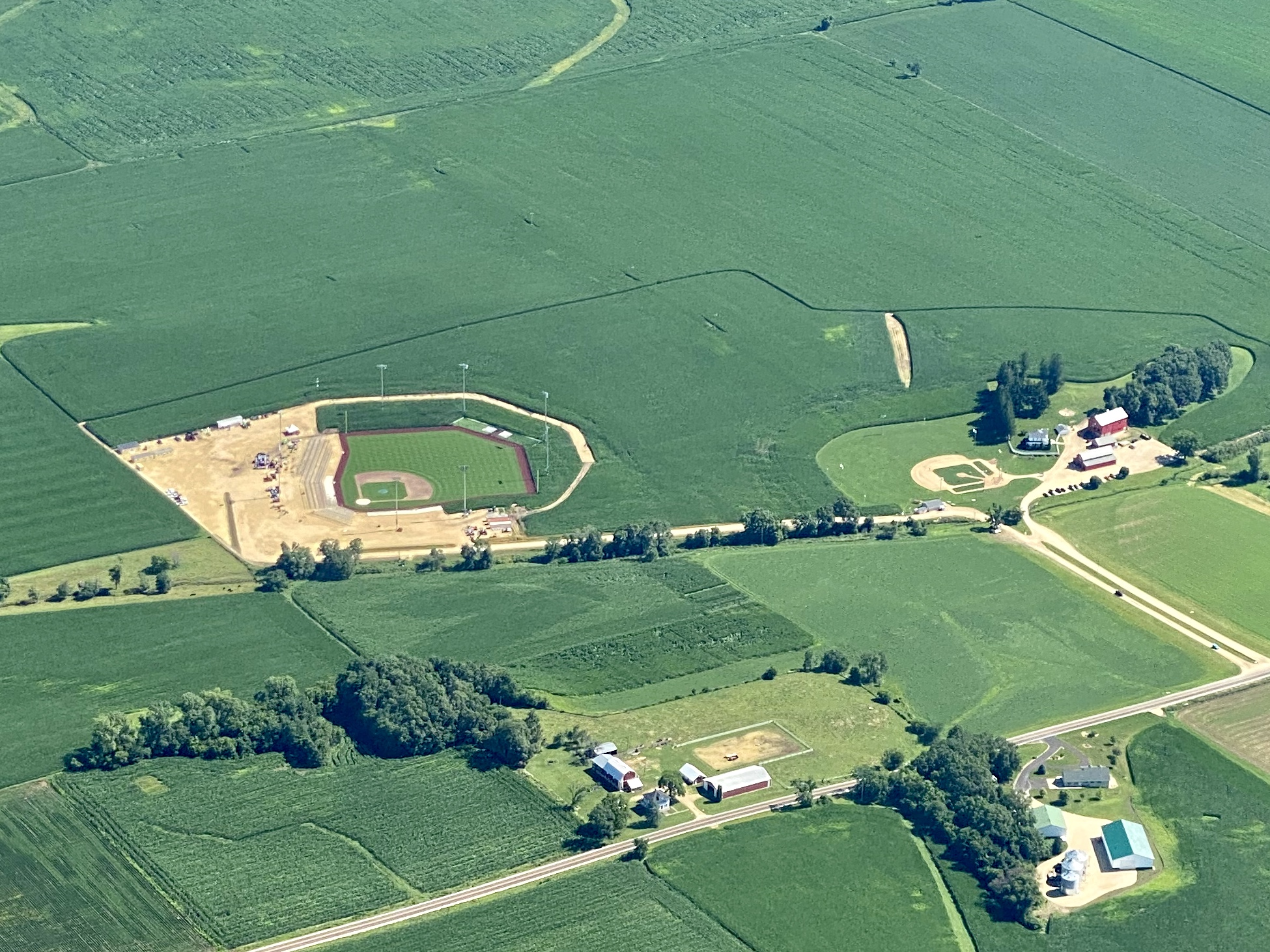
MLB ballpark to the left of the movie-set field, 2020
