= Minnesota Mud Puppies =

Baseball team in Minnesota, United States

Information
- League: Northwoods League (Great Plains East Division)
- Location: Savage, Minnesota
- Ballpark: None (travel team)
- Founded: 2021
- Colors: Red, Black, Gray, White

The Minnesota Mud Puppies are a baseball team that plays in the collegiate summer Northwoods League (NWL). Based at the MASH training facility in Savage, Minnesota, the Mud Puppies are exclusively a travel team and play all of their games in the home stadiums of NWL opponents.

== History ==
The NWL's Thunder Bay Border Cats were not able to participate in the league's 2021 season due to Covid-19 pandemic Canada–United States border restrictions. To make up for the schedule absence of the Border Cats, the league created the Mud Puppies as a travel-only team. In their first season, the team logged a 10-26 record, the lowest winning percentage in the NWL. The Border Cats were again unable to participate in 2022, and the Mud Puppies took their place, this time posting a 7-29 record.

The Border Cats returned to the NWL in 2023, but the Mud Puppies remained in the league. With the addition of the expansion Minot Hot Tots franchise, the Mud Puppies allowed the league to maintain an even number of teams. They played a restricted schedule, posting a 12-32 record. This record bested only the Hot Tots (16-51) for winning percentage among all 24 NWL teams.

In 2024, they once again competed in the NWL, a year that saw the league expand to 26 with the additions of the Badlands Big Sticks and Royal Oak Leprechauns. The Mud Puppies' record in 2024 was 5-28. After that season, the Kokomo Jackrabbits ceased operations and the Mud Puppies were also deactivated for the 2025 season.

In December of 2025, the NWL announced that the Mud Puppies would be returning after a one-year hiatus. The league announced plans to add the Richmond Flying Mummies to the NWL baseball branch, and the Mud Puppies' return put the list of teams to an even 26. The Mud Puppies finished the 2026 Northwoods League season with a record of 13-22.

== Identity ==
The nickname Mud Puppies is a reference to the Dubuque Mud Puppies of Dubuque, Iowa, one of the original five teams when the NWL was founded in 1994. In another homage to Dubuque, Minnesota features a similar color scheme of red, black, gray, and white, but has updated logos featuring a cartoon mud puppy in various poses.

== Player highlights ==
=== Northwoods League All-Stars ===
The following Mud Puppies have been selected to either the Northwoods League mid-season All-Star Game and/or the full-season All-Star Team.

Player	Position	College	Season	Mid-season or full-season
Duke Benge	P	Air Force	2021	Mid-season
Ben Vujovich	UTL	St. Thomas	2022	Mid-season
Jacob Mrosko	P	St. Thomas	2022	Full-season
Tanner Recchio	INF	St. Thomas	2023	Mid-season
Joshua Dykhoff	P	Minnesota-Crookston	2023	Mid-season
Brock Larsen	UTL	Minnesota-Crookston	2024	Mid-season
Liam Martin	P	Montevallo	2024	Mid-season
Owen Bond	OF	St. Thomas	2026	Mid-season

=== Alumni in pro baseball ===
As of the end of 2025, a total of four former Minnesota Mud Puppies were a part of MLB organizations. All four are pitchers who were selected in the 2024 Major League Baseball Draft. Tucker Novotny (drafted by the Oakland Athletics) played for the 2021 Mud Puppies, while Connor Wietgrefe (Pittsburgh Pirates), Brandt Thompson (St. Louis Cardinals), and Ryan Lambert (New York Mets) all played for the 2022 squad.

Lambert played a second season with the Mud Puppies in 2023, where he was scouted (and later signed) by the Oklahoma Sooners, who had learned about Lambert after he posted a video to social media of him throwing 99 MPH.
