= Manitowoc Skunks =

Collegiate summer baseball team in Wisconsin

Information
- League: Northwoods League (1994-1997)
- Location: Manitowoc, Wisconsin
- Founded: 1994
- Colors: Black, yellow, white

The Manitowoc Skunks were an American baseball team that played in the Northwoods League, a collegiate summer baseball league. They played their home games in Manitowoc, Wisconsin.

== History ==
The Skunks began play in 1994 as one of the five original franchises in the Northwoods League, along with the Rochester Honkers, Wausau Woodchucks, Kenosha Kroakers, and Dubuque Mud Puppies. In the league's inaugural season, all teams were owned by the league.

After their fourth season, 1997, the Skunks franchise ceased operations.

== Skunks in MLB ==
The following is a list of former Skunks to appear in Major League Baseball.

Name	Year(s) with Skunks	MLB Debut	MLB Accolades
Jay Gibbons	1996–97	2001 (Baltimore Orioles)	
Juan Pierre	1996	2000 (Colorado Rockies)	World Series Champion (2003)
