= Pat Hoberg =

American baseball umpire (born 1986)

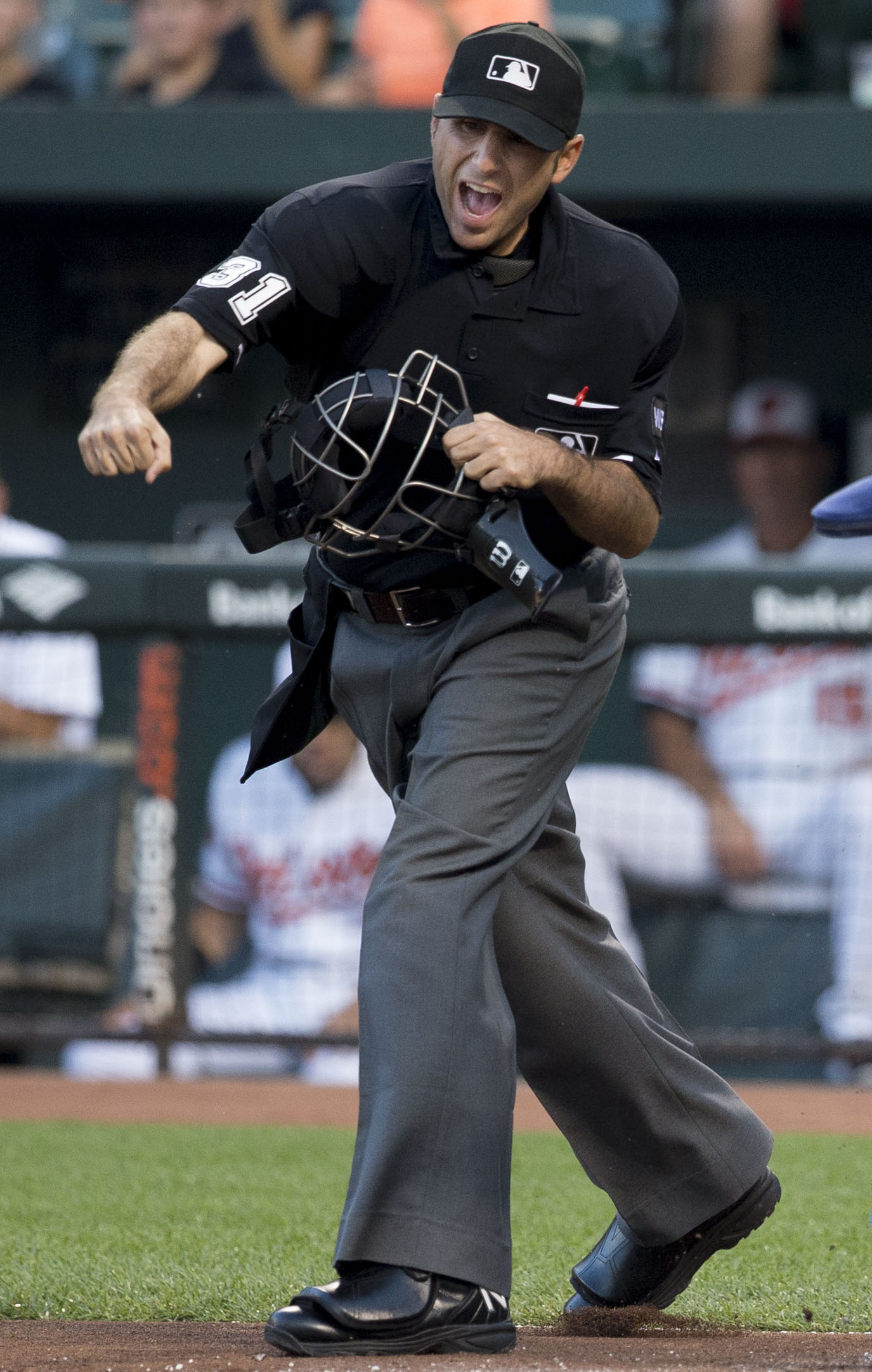
- Hoberg in 2014
- Born: September 11, 1986 (age 40); Des Moines, Iowa, U.S.

MLB debut
- March 31, 2014

Last MLB appearance
- September 17, 2023

Career highlights and awards
- Special Assignments: Wild Card Games (2018, 2020); Division Series (2019, 2021, 2022); League Championship Series (2020); World Series (2022); World Baseball Classic (2023); Field of Dreams Game (2021); MLB Little League Classic (2017); Called a perfect game on October 29, 2022.

Patrick Hoberg (born September 11, 1986) is an American former Major League Baseball (MLB) umpire.

Hoberg rose to prominence as the home plate umpire for Game 2 of the 2022 World Series, during which he did not make a single incorrect ball or strike call. Less than two years later, he was out of the league after being accused of gambling on sports.

== Career ==
A native of Des Moines, Iowa, Hoberg graduated from Urbandale High School and Grand View University.

Hoberg made his Major League debut in 2014, and was one of four umpires promoted to the full-time staff in February 2017, upon the retirements of Bob Davidson, John Hirschbeck, Jim Joyce, and Tim Welke.

For the 2018 regular season, he was found to be a Top 10 performing home plate umpire in terms of accuracy in calling balls and strikes. His error rate was 7.93 percent. This was based on a study conducted at Boston University where 372,442 pitches were culled and analyzed.

In August 2021, Hoberg was assigned as the home plate umpire for the inaugural Field of Dreams game between the New York Yankees and Chicago White Sox in Dyersville, Iowa.

=== Perfect game ===
On October 29, 2022, during Game 2 of the 2022 World Series between the Philadelphia Phillies and Houston Astros at Minute Maid Park, Hoberg called a "perfect game" with 129 of 129 taken pitches called correctly, the first such game since MLB began tracking pitch locations using Statcast in 2015. Hoberg was widely regarded as the best ball-strike umpire in MLB.

=== Gambling investigation ===
On June 14, 2024, MLB announced that Hoberg was disciplined following an investigation into a violation of the league's gambling rules. Hoberg appealed the decision, denying having bet on baseball. He did not umpire any games during the 2024 season. It was later revealed that the investigation began in February, and he was initially fired on May 31.

Hoberg appealed this decision, but his firing was upheld by MLB on February 3, 2025. The investigation revealed that the umpire shared betting accounts with a friend, and that the friend used the account to bet on MLB games, including games Hoberg umpired; there is no evidence that Hoberg showed bias as an umpire. Hoberg also allegedly deleted evidence pertaining to the league's investigation.
