= Rochester Honkers =

Logo
Cap insignia

Information
- League: Northwoods League (Great Plains West 2019–2026) (North Division 1994–2018)
- Location: Rochester, Minnesota
- Ballpark: TBD
- Founded: 1994
- Division championships: 1994; 1996; 1997; 1998; 1999; 2006; 2009; 2010
- League championships: 1994; 1997; 1999; 2006; 2009
- Former ballpark: Mayo Field
- Colors: Purple, black, dark gray, gray, teal, white
- Mascot: Slider
- Ownership: Bases Loaded Entertainment, LLC
- Management: Clint Narramore, general manager
- Manager: Cade Peters
- Media: Rochester Post-Bulletin
- Website: rochesterhonkers.com

The Rochester Honkers are an amateur baseball team in the Northwoods League, a collegiate summer baseball league. They are currently on hiatus through at least the 2027 season, with their status dependent on a potential new stadium in Rochester.

The Honkers are one of the original five Northwoods League franchises, entering the league in 1994 alongside the Wausau Woodchucks, Dubuque Mud Puppies, Kenosha Kroakers and Manitowoc Skunks. They have won the Northwoods League championship a record five times.

From 1994 through 2026, Honkers home games were played at Mayo Field in Rochester, Minnesota.In July 2026, the team confirmed they would not play during the 2027 season. The move followed an announcement that the team would stop playing at Mayo Field at the conclusion of the 2026 season.

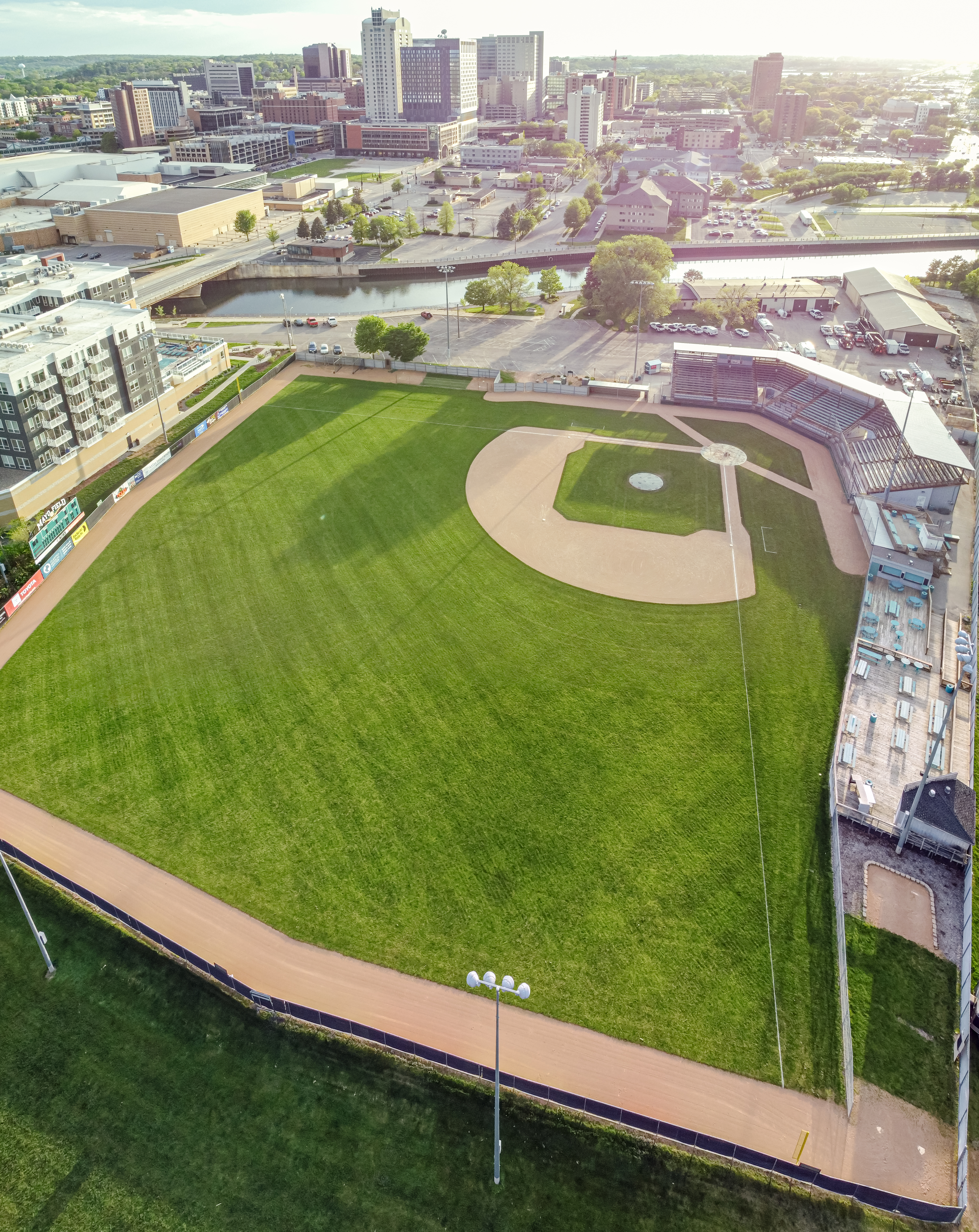
Mayo Field

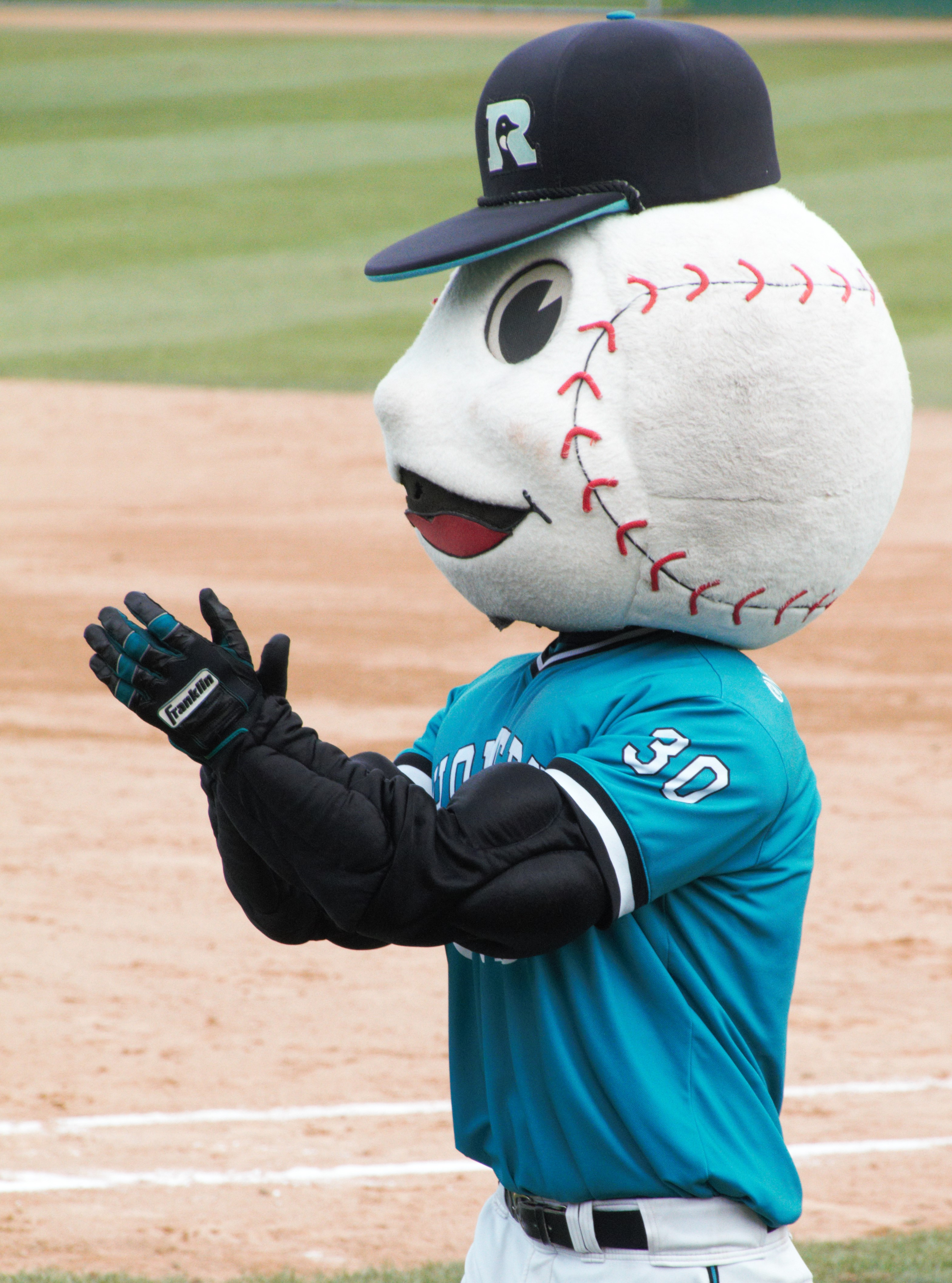
Slider, the team mascot

== Honkers in MLB ==
The following is a list of former Rochester Honkers to have played in Major League Baseball, with All-Stars in bold.

- Zach Cole (hit a home run in his first MLB at-bat)
- Mark Contreras
- Drew Ellis
- **Andre Ethier** (2x All-Star, Gold Glove, Silver Slugger)
- Brian Flynn
- Drew Gagnon
- Kyle Garlick
- Tony Kemp (World Series champion)
- Jay Marshall
- Miles Mastrobuoni
- Scott McGough
- Efrén Navarro
- Valentino Pascucci
- Tim Peterson
- Matt Reynolds
- Dustin Richardson
- D. J. Snelten
- **Matt Strahm** (All-Star)
- Chad Wallach
- Dan Winkler
