= William E. Somerville =

- Born: 12 April 1869; Harthill, Lanarkshire, Scotland
- Died: 25 September 1950 (aged 81)
- Resting place: Mount Olivet Cemetery, Wilmington, Illinois
- Education: Glasgow Technical College
- Political party: Republican
- Spouse: Bertha Piagno
- Children: Constance, Lillian and Peter
- Parent(s): William and Christina (Edgington) Somerville

William E. Somerville (12 April 1869 – 25 September 1950) was a Scottish-American aircraft engineer.

== Early life ==
William E. Sommervile's father was a mechanical engineer in Scotland. Sommerville studied as a marine engineer in Scotland. Somerville immigrated to America in 1892 and worked as an electrical engineer for General Electric in Coal City, Illinois, later working for McComber Wire Rope Company. In 1907 he became mayor of Coal City, keeping the title until 1913. About the same time, he met and flew gliders designed by Octave Chanute in nearby Gary, Indiana. In 1910, Somerville started the Illinois Aero Construction Company with $250,000 in capitalization. Somerville designed a $40,000 seven-passenger aircraft believed to be one of the earliest with a forward facing engine. Somerville patented up-curled wing ends (winglets) which were the first practical application of the device in an aircraft. In 1911 Somerville leased 160 acres to build an airport and construct gliders. Somerville was sued by the Wright brothers for patent infringements, but the case was dropped.

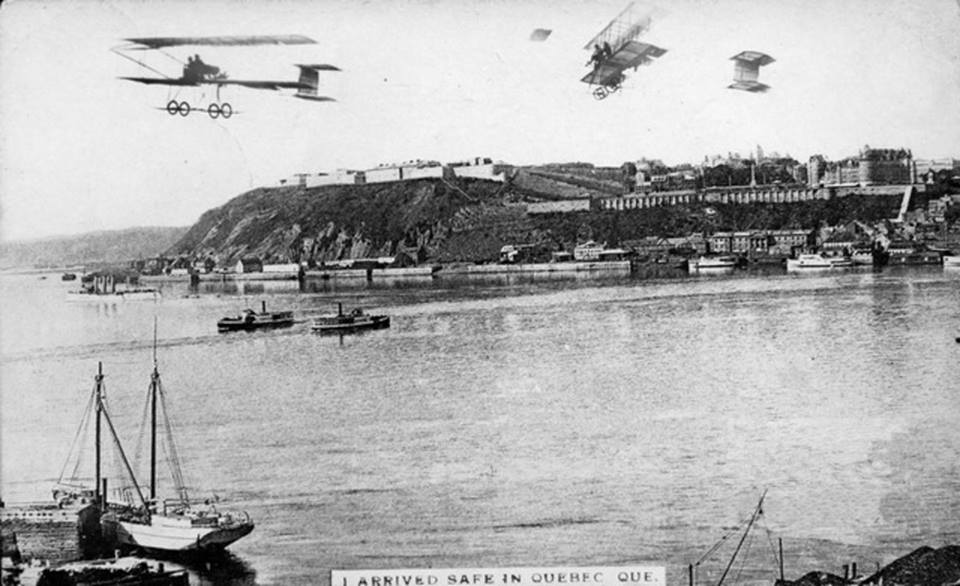
George Mestach over Quebec City, 1911

In 1912 Somerville hired pilot George Mestach to fly mail using his aircraft between New Orleans and Baton Rouge. Mestach was involved in a mid-air crash with a Wright biplane in Chicago later in the year that killed pilot Howard Gill but left Mestach uninjured. Mestach was flying a Borel-Morane biplane, which was used as the basis for Somerville's first monoplane, which featured wing leveling stabilizers. Sommerville changed interests, eventually becoming a captain in the Home Guard during World War I.

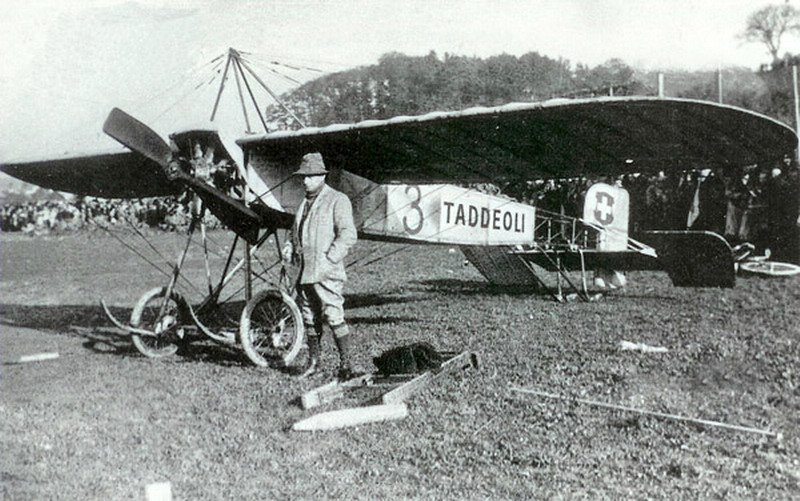
A Morane-Borel monoplane

On 13 December 1924 a fire destroyed all of Sommerville's buildings and aircraft. Somerville hired Earl Daugherty to fly a Morane-Borel monoplane in a Barnstorming act across the Midwest. The biplane is now owned by the Canada Aviation and Space Museum. Somerville started the Somerville Engineering Company on the land once used as an airfield. He also founded the Wood-Web Porch Shade Company based on shades he saw in Germany

Somerville was also an accomplished musician, being featured as a solo clarinet with John Philip Sousa. He died at age 81 in 1950.

In 2010 Somerville was inducted into the Illinois Aviation Hall of Fame.
