= Simmons Field =

Baseball stadium in Kenosha, Wisconsin

Coordinates: 42.561963°N 87.824686°W

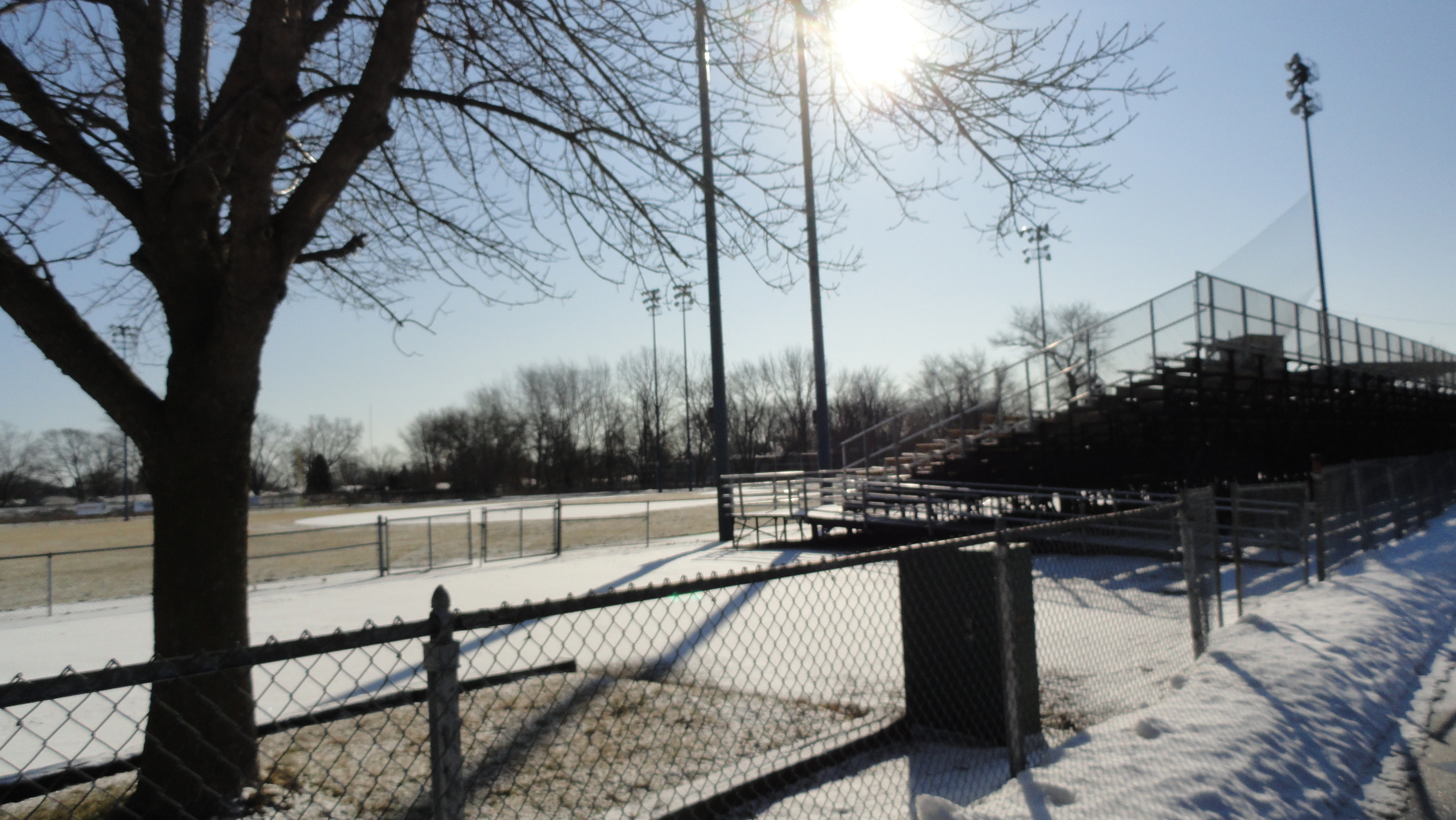
- Simmons Field before it was the home to the Kingfish

- Location within Wisconsin
- Interactive map of Simmons Field
- Address: 7817 Sheridan Road; Kenosha, Wisconsin; United States
- Capacity: 3,218
- Surface: Artificial Turf
- Field size: Left field – 314 ft (95.7 m); Center field – 400 ft (121.9 m); Right field – 330 ft (100.6 m)
- Public transit: Kenosha Area Transit

Construction
- Opened: 1920

Tenants
- Kenosha Comets (AAGPBL) 1943–1951; Kenosha Twins (MWL) 1984–1992; Kenosha Kroakers (NWL) 1994–1998; Kenosha Mammoths (FL) 2003; Kenosha Kingfish (NWL) 2014–present UW—Parkside Baseball (NCAA) 2019–present Kenosha St. Joes High School baseball 2024–present Shoreland Lutheran High School baseball 2026–present

Simmons Field is a baseball stadium in Kenosha, Wisconsin. It is currently home to the Kenosha Kingfish of the Northwoods League, the University of Wisconsin-Parkside Rangers NCAA Division II baseball team, and a semi-pro team, the Kenosha Kings. It was the home field of the Kenosha Comets of the All-American Girls Professional Baseball League (AAGPBL). Since 2024, it has hosted the Kenosha vs Racine High School baseball All-Star Game.

== History ==
Simmons Field opened in 1920 with a capacity of 7,000 as a home field for the Simmons Bedmakers, the Simmons Bedding Company's baseball team. The wooden grandstand burned down in its inaugural year and was rebuilt in 1930.

Simmons sold the field in 1947, and the Kenosha Comets of the All-American Girls Professional Baseball League (AAGPBL) began play at Simmons Field in 1948. They would play at Simmons Field from 1948 to 1951.

In 1984, Bob Lee purchased the Minnesota Twins Single-A Midwest League affiliate and moved them from Wisconsin Rapids to Kenosha to become the Kenosha Twins. While in Kenosha, $350,000 of improvements were made to Simmons Field and the Twins won two Midwest League championships. After the 1992 season the Twins moved to Fort Wayne, Indiana to become the Fort Wayne Wizards (today the Fort Wayne TinCaps).

Like the Twins, the Kenosha Kings also began play at Simmons Field in 1984. A semi-pro team in the Wisconsin State League, they are the longest-residing team at Simmons Field.

The semi-pro Kenosha Chiefs played at Simmons Field in 1993, and the Kenosha Kroakers played in the Northwoods League's inaugural season in 1994 and would play at Simmons Field until 1998. The Green Bay Packers played a charity softball game in 1998, and 'N Sync played one in 1999.

Simmons Field was home to professional baseball once more in 2003 when the Dubois County Dragons of the independent Frontier League moved and became the Kenosha Mammoths, who left after one season.

The nonprofit Kenosha Simmons Baseball Organization worked to restore the stadium, and the City of Kenosha partnered with the owners of the Kenosha Kingfish to further upgrade the stadium at a cost of $1.4 million. The renovation was named the "Best Ballpark Renovation Under $2 Million" of 2014 from Ballpark Digest. The Kingfish began play at Simmons Field in 2014, and won the Northwoods League championship in 2015.

Starting with the 2019 season, the University of Wisconsin-Parkside Rangers baseball team moved their home games from Oberbrunner Field on the UW-Parkside campus to Simmons Field.

In 2023, it was announced that Simmons Field were having massive renovations. Ballpark renovations before the 2024 season included an artificial turf playing surface, an all new state-of-the-art scoreboard to replace the old scoreboard, a brand new lighting system and an upgraded netting system behind home plate that extends down the baselines that are following Minor League Baseball's field recommendations on fan safety netting.

== Features ==
Simmons Field has a capacity of 3,218, and more than 2,100 seats in the stadium are from Camden Yards. In left field, The Bambino, forms part of the wall along with the Miller Lite Fish Bowl Club.
