= Kenosha Kroakers =

Collegiate summer baseball team in Wisconsin

Information
- League: Northwoods League (1994-1998)
- Location: Kenosha, Wisconsin
- Ballpark: Simmons Field
- Founded: 1994
- League championships: 1995

The Kenosha Kroakers were an American baseball team that played in the Northwoods League, a collegiate summer baseball league. They played their home games at Simmons Field in Kenosha, Wisconsin.

== History ==
The Kroakers began play in 1994 as one of the five original franchises in the Northwoods League, along with the Rochester Honkers, Wausau Woodchucks, Manitowoc Skunks, and Dubuque Mud Puppies. The Kroakers played their home games in historic Simmons Field, which had previously been home to the affiliated minor league Kenosha Twins of the Midwest League. In the league's inaugural season, all teams were owned by the league.

In 1995, the NWL's second season, the Kroakers won the league championship, defeating the Manitowoc Skunks. The championship team featured four future MLB players: Jermaine Clark, Joe Nelson, Erasmo Ramirez, and Andy Dominique.

After their fifth season, 1998, the Kroakers franchise was removed from the rapidly-expanding NWL. In 2014, the league returned to Kenosha, with the expansion Kenosha Kingfish playing in Simmons Field.

== Kroakers in MLB ==
The following is a list of former Kroakers to appear in Major League Baseball.

Name	Year(s) with Kroakers	MLB Debut	MLB Accolades
Clint Barmes	1998	2003 (Colorado Rockies)	NL Rookie of the Month (2005)
Jermaine Clark	1995	2001 (Detroit Tigers)	
Andy Dominique	1995	2004 (Boston Red Sox)	
Bobby Kielty	1996	2001 (Minnesota Twins)	World Series Champion (2007)
Joe Nelson	1995	2001 (Atlanta Braves)	
Erasmo Ramirez	1995	2003 (Texas Rangers)	
George Sherrill	1997–98	2004 (Seattle Mariners)	AL All-Star (2008)
