= Mayo Field =

Mayo Field may refer to two sports venues in the United States:

- Mayo Field (Centenary College), in Shreveport, Louisiana
- Mayo Field (Rochester, Minnesota), Rochester, Minnesota
