= Coal City High School =

School in Illinois, United States

Location
- 655 W Division St; Coal City, Illinois 60416; United States

Information
- Superintendent: Christopher Spencer
- Principal: Corey Mikula
- Faculty: 42.47 (on FTE basis)
- Enrollment: 685
- Student to teacher ratio: 16.03
- Website: Coal City High School

Coal City High School is a four-year high school in north-central Illinois. As of 2021, the school has 685 students, and is a member of the Illinois High School Association and the Illinois Central Eight Conference.

Coal City High School has an "A+ Rating" from the home-facts rating service.

== Notable alumni ==
- Denise Stillman, entrepreneur and preservationist
- Greg Washburn, former MLB player (California Angels)
