= Mankato Mets =

- 1967–1968; Mankato, Minnesota

Minor league affiliations
- Class: Class A Short Season
- League: Northern League

Major league affiliations
- Team: New York Mets

Team data
- Name: Mankato Mets
- Ballpark: Key City Park
- Owner/ Operator: Mankato Area Baseball Corp.

The Mankato Mets were a professional minor league baseball team that existed from 1967 to 1968 in the Northern League. Located in Mankato, Minnesota, the team was affiliated with the New York Mets for its entire existence. The Mets played at Key City Park during both years of operation.

== Year-by-year record ==
Year	Record	Finish	Manager	Reference
1967	37–33	2nd	Buddy Peterson	
1968	42–27	2nd	Joe Frazier	
