= Northwoods League =

Collegiate summer baseball wooden bat league

- Current season, competition or edition: 2026 Northwoods League season
- Founded: 1994
- Sports fielded: men's: baseball; women's: fastpitch softball
- Divisions: Great Lakes Division, Great Plains Division
- No. of teams: 26 baseball, 6 softball
- Countries: United States, Canada
- Continent: North America
- Most recent champions: Baseball: Royal Oak Leprechauns (2026); Softball: Madison Night Mares (2) (2026)
- Most titles: Rochester Honkers (5)
- Level on pyramid: Collegiate summer
- Website: www.northwoodsleague.com

The Northwoods League is a collegiate summer wooden-bat baseball and fastpitch softball organization. The teams are located in the greater Northwoods region of the Upper Midwestern United States (Wisconsin, Minnesota, Michigan, North Dakota, Iowa, Illinois and Indiana) and Northwestern Ontario, Canada.

As of the end of the 2026 season, 437 Northwoods League alums have gone on to play in Major League Baseball, including Max Scherzer, Chris Sale, Curtis Granderson, Marcus Semien, Ben Zobrist, Matt Chapman, Brandon Crawford, and Pete Alonso.

== History ==
=== 1990s ===
In 1994, The Northwoods League (NWL) held its first season with five charter teams, the Rochester Honkers, Wausau Woodchucks, Dubuque Mud Puppies, Kenosha Kroakers and Manitowoc Skunks. The Honkers won the league's first championship. The Waterloo Bucks were added in 1995. The Mud Puppies moved to St. Cloud, Minnesota after the 1996 season, becoming the St. Cloud River Bats. The Skunks franchise folded in 1997.

In 1998, the league expanded to eight, adding the Brainerd Mighty Gulls, Grand Forks Channel Cats and Southern Minny Stars. All three of these new markets had previously hosted teams in the independent Prairie League, which ceased operations in 1997. Of the three, only the Stars kept the same name and branding. The Kroakers franchise folded after the 1998 season. As they were the only team left in the state, Wausau changed their name to the Wisconsin Woodchucks. The NWL was able to maintain eight teams in 1999 by adding the Mankato Mashers.

In 1999, Jeff Weaver became the first NWL alum to appear in a Major League Baseball game, debuting with the Detroit Tigers. Weaver had played with Dubuque in 1995.

=== 2000s ===
In 2000, the Southern Minny Stars moved to Minot, North Dakota. The Minot Greenheads played one lone season in 2000 before phasing out of the league. The Channel Cats also folded in 2000. In 2001, two new franchises—the Alexandria Beetles and Madison Mallards—were added to the league. In 2002, the Mashers changed their nickname to the MoonDogs. The Brainerd Mighty Gulls folded after the 2002 season. In 2003, three new teams brought the NWL's total back to ten. The league's geographic footprint extended internationally when the Thunder Bay Border Cats of Ontario were added. The Duluth Huskies and La Crosse Loggers also joined that season. In 2004, the league expanded by two, adding the Eau Claire Express and Brainerd Blue Thunder. The Thunder would later change their name to the Brainerd Lakes Area Lunkers.

In 2003, Juan Pierre became the first NWL alum to win a World Series, doing so with the Florida Marlins. Pierre played for Manitowoc in 1996. In 2008, George Sherrill became the first NWL alum to appear in an MLB All-Star Game, representing the Baltimore Orioles. Sherrill had played for Kenosha in 1997 and 1998. The following summer, both Curtis Granderson (Mankato, '01) and Ben Zobrist (Wisconsin, '03) played in the midsummer classic. Also in 2009, Andre Ethier (Rochester, '02) became the first NWL alum to win a Silver Slugger Award. Two years later, he became the first alum to win a Gold Glove Award.

In 2007, the Green Bay Bullfrogs and Battle Creek Bombers were added, bringing the total number of teams to fourteen. The Bombers represented the league's first foray into Michigan. Actor Tyler Hoechlin, just a few years removed from his award-winning performance in Road to Perdition, played for the Bombers while pursuing a baseball career. He missed some potential acting opportunities, including a meeting with Francis Ford Coppola, due to Northwoods League action.

=== 2010s ===
In 2010, the league added the Willmar Stingers and Wisconsin Rapids Rafters, expanding to sixteen total teams. The Lunkers folded after the 2011 season. The league remained at sixteen teams in 2012 by adding the Lakeshore Chinooks of Mequon, Wisconsin, whose ownership group included Baseball Hall of Fame members Bob Uecker and Robin Yount. In 2012, the St. Cloud River Bats changed their nickname to the Rox, taking on the moniker of a former affiliated Northern League team of the same name.

In 2013, while playing for the Chinooks, future MLB standout Harrison Bader lived with Craig Counsell and his family at their home in Whitefish Bay, Wisconsin. Also in 2013, Max Scherzer (La Crosse, '04) became the first NWL alum to win a Cy Young Award, doing so as a member of the Detroit Tigers.

In 2013, Alexandria changed their nickname to the Blue Anchors. In 2014, the league expanded by two, continuing eastward with the Kalamazoo Growlers and adding a charter city back to the mix with the Kenosha Kingfish. The Blue Anchors ceased operations following the 2015 season. In 2016, the Rockford Rivets were added, becoming the league's first team in Illinois. The NWL returned to North Dakota in 2017 with the Bismarck Larks while adding another Wisconsin team with the Fond du Lac Dock Spiders. This put the league at an even twenty teams.

In 2017, two former La Crosse Loggers, Scherzer and Chris Sale, faced each other as the starting pitchers in the 2017 Major League Baseball All-Star Game, with Scherzer representing the Washington Nationals and Sale the Boston Red Sox. The same matchup was repeated in the 2018 Major League Baseball All-Star Game. In 2019, Pete Alonso (Madison '14) became the first NWL alum to win National League Rookie of the Year, doing so as a member of the New York Mets. He also won the Major League Baseball Home Run Derby for the first time that year.

Heading into the 2019 season, two franchises shifted from other leagues to the NWL, bringing the total number of teams to 22. The Frontier League's Traverse City Beach Bums franchise was transferred, although renamed to the Pit Spitters after the move. The Kokomo Jackrabbits were brought over from the Prospect League, name retained, and were the first NWL team in Indiana. Also in 2019, the Bullfrogs changed their nickname and played as the Green Bay Booyah.

In response to the increased number of teams and new geographic implications, the league realigned for 2019, going from two divisions (North and South) to two divisions (Great Plains and Great Lakes) with East and West subdivisions within each. The playoff structure was also changed. The one-game quarterfinal was replaced with a best-of-three series, and the best-of-three championship series was replaced with a single League Championship game.

=== 2020s ===
In 2020, six teams cancelled their season due to the COVID-19 pandemic. For those teams that did play, instead of playing within their usual divisions, they played in hub regions, with some creating temporary teams. The Kingfish competed against the K-Town Bobbers, with both teams based in Kenosha and sharing a stadium. In Traverse City, the Pit Spitters competed against the Northern Michigan Dune Bears and Great Lakes Resorters. The Bombers and Growlers competed in a Michigan South Division, with the latter adding the Kalamazoo Mac Daddies as a temporary team. In Bismarck, the Larks competed against the Mandan Flickertails and Bismarck Bull Moose. All six of these temporary teams were disbanded after the 2020 season.

In 2021, the Thunder Bay Border Cats were again unable to compete in the league due to pandemic border restrictions. The league responded by creating a travel-only team called the Minnesota Mud Puppies. The Mud Puppies took their nickname from the original Dubuque franchise. Players trained and lived in the greater Twin Cities area but did not have a home stadium, playing all away games. In 2022, two teams changed their nickname. After three seasons as the Booyah, Green Bay became the Rockers. In Battle Creek, the Bombers renamed themselves the Battle Jacks. Additionally, the Wisconsin Woodchucks changed their place name designator to Wausau, reverting to the full team name they used in the early years of the NWL. In 2023, the league continued to expand its North Dakota presence, returning to Minot with the Minot Hot Tots. Also that year, the Border Cats returned to the league after three missed seasons. Despite this, the Mud Puppies continued to operate as a travel team.

In 2023, the Northwoods League announced plans to create a new softball league, with teams initially playing in current NWL stadiums that are temporarily converted for softball. The softball branch of the league (also called NWLS) began with four teams, based in Madison (Madison Night Mares) and La Crosse, Wisconsin (La Crosse Steam); Mankato, Minnesota (Mankato Habaneros); and Minot, North Dakota (Minot Honeybees). The softball league had its inaugural season in 2024, with the Habaneros being awarded the championship.

In 2024, the Badlands Big Sticks of Dickinson, North Dakota were added. The Big Sticks had been a franchise in Independence League Baseball (and the Expedition League before that) and the team identity was carried over to the NWL. The Royal Oak Leprechauns were also added that season. The Leprechauns were formerly of the Great Lakes Summer Collegiate League, and their addition to the NWL increased the number of Michigan-based teams to four. After the 2024 season the Jackrabbits ceased operations. The Mud Puppies were also deactivated for 2025.

In 2025, the softball branch of the NWL expanded with the addition of the Wausau Ignite. For 2026, the league expanded to Grand Forks, North Dakota, becoming the first Northwoods League Softball team to play in a non-Northwoods League Baseball stadium. On November 11, 2025, the team's name was revealed as the Grand Forks Spitfires. Also in 2025, it was announced the NWL would be returning to Indiana in the form of the Richmond Flying Mummies. After being sidelined for 2025, the league announced the Mud Puppies would return again in 2026.

Ahead of the 2026 season, the co-owner of the Rochester Honkers, citing inadequate facilities, announced that the season would be their last at Mayo Field. He later clarified that the team would be going on hiatus for the 2027 season at least. In 2026, the league announced that there would be two new expansion teams for the 2027 season. One will be in New Buffalo, Michigan, and they will be known as the Dune Coast QuillBacks. The other will be a permanent tenant at the Field of Dreams Ballpark near Dyersville, Iowa, and they will be known as the Dyersville Dreamers.

== Teams ==
=== Baseball teams ===
Northwoods League Baseball
Division	Team	Location	Stadium	Capacity
Great Lakes Division
East	Battle Creek Battle Jacks	Battle Creek, Michigan	C.O. Brown Stadium	2,193
East	Kalamazoo Growlers	Kalamazoo, Michigan	Homer Stryker Field	4,000
East	Kenosha Kingfish	Kenosha, Wisconsin	Simmons Field	3,218
East	Richmond Flying Mummies	Richmond, Indiana	Don McBride Stadium	1,787
East	Rockford Rivets	Loves Park, Illinois	Rivets Stadium	3,279
East	Royal Oak Leprechauns	Royal Oak, Michigan	Memorial Park	1,000
East	Traverse City Pit Spitters	Chums Corner, Michigan	Turtle Creek Stadium	4,200
West	Fond du Lac Dock Spiders	Fond du Lac, Wisconsin	Herr-Baker Field	2,000
West	Green Bay Rockers	Ashwaubenon, Wisconsin	Capital Credit Union Park	3,359
West	Lakeshore Chinooks	Mequon, Wisconsin	Kapco Park	3,000
West	Madison Mallards	Madison, Wisconsin	Warner Park	7,500
West	Wausau Woodchucks	Wausau, Wisconsin	Athletic Park	3,850
West	Wisconsin Rapids Rafters	Wisconsin Rapids, Wisconsin	Witter Field	1,560
Great Plains Division
East	Duluth Huskies	Duluth, Minnesota	Wade Stadium	4,200
East	Eau Claire Express	Eau Claire, Wisconsin	Carson Park	2,856
East	La Crosse Loggers	La Crosse, Wisconsin	Copeland Park	3,550
East	Minnesota Mud Puppies	Savage, Minnesota	Traveling team	−
East	Thunder Bay Border Cats	Thunder Bay, Ontario	Port Arthur Stadium	3,031
East	Waterloo Bucks	Waterloo, Iowa	Riverfront Stadium	5,000
West	Badlands Big Sticks	Dickinson, North Dakota	Dakota Community Bank & Trust Ballpark	1,200
West	Bismarck Larks	Bismarck, North Dakota	Bismarck Municipal Ballpark	1,900
West	Mankato MoonDogs	Mankato, Minnesota	ISG Field	4,000
West	Minot Hot Tots	Minot, North Dakota	Corbett Field	1,266
West	St. Cloud Rox	St. Cloud, Minnesota	Joe Faber Field	2,000
West	Willmar Stingers	Willmar, Minnesota	Bill Taunton Stadium	1,500
Future expansion
2027	Dune Coast QuillBacks	New Buffalo, Michigan	New Buffalo Area Schools baseball stadium	TBD
2027	Dyersville Dreamers	Dyersville, Iowa	Field of Dreams Ballpark	4,000
Hiatus
TBD	Rochester Honkers	Rochester, Minnesota	TBD	-

==== Map of baseball teams ====
Great Lakes East, Great Lakes West, Great Plains East, Great Plains West
Expansion Teams On Hiatus

=== Softball teams ===
Northwoods League Softball
Team	Location	Stadium	Capacity
Grand Forks Spitfires	Grand Forks, North Dakota	Albrecht Field	1,000
La Crosse Steam	La Crosse, Wisconsin	Copeland Park	3,550
Madison Night Mares	Madison, Wisconsin	Warner Park	7,500
Mankato Habaneros	Mankato, Minnesota	ISG Field	4,000
Minot Honeybees	Minot, North Dakota	Corbett Field	1,266
Wausau Ignite	Wausau, Wisconsin	Athletic Park	3,850

== Competition ==
Baseball teams play approximately 72 games scheduled from Memorial Day to the second Saturday in August. The season itself is broken into two halves, and the team with the best sub-divisional record in each half is granted a playoff berth, resulting in a playoff field with eight teams total.

The playoffs begin immediately following the regular season, with the two half-season winners in each of the four sub-divisions playing against each other to determine a sub-divisional champion in a best-of-three series. The four sub-divisional champions then meet in a winner-take-all game to determine a divisional champion. The divisional champions then meet in a winner-take-all game for the league championship.

Softball teams play approximately 40 games each over the course of about 8 weeks, with the season starting in June. In the inaugural season (2024) of the softball league, the team with the best record was awarded the championship with no playoff. In 2025, a best-of-three Championship series was added, with the teams having the top two records competing against each other.

== Champions ==
=== Baseball champions ===
Season	Champion	Runner-up
1994	Rochester Honkers	None (best record)
1995	Kenosha Kroakers	Manitowoc Skunks
1996	Waterloo Bucks	Rochester Honkers
1997	Rochester Honkers (2)	Waterloo Bucks
1998	St. Cloud River Bats	Rochester Honkers
1999	Rochester Honkers (3)	St. Cloud River Bats
2000	St. Cloud River Bats (2)	Waterloo Bucks
2001	Wisconsin Woodchucks	St. Cloud River Bats
2002	Waterloo Bucks (2)	Brainerd Mighty Gulls
2003	Wisconsin Woodchucks (2)	St. Cloud River Bats
2004	Madison Mallards	Duluth Huskies
2005	Thunder Bay Border Cats	Madison Mallards
2006	Rochester Honkers (4)	Thunder Bay Border Cats
2007	St. Cloud River Bats (3)	Eau Claire Express
2008	Thunder Bay Border Cats (2)	Madison Mallards
2009	Rochester Honkers (5)	La Crosse Loggers
2010	Eau Claire Express	Rochester Honkers
2011	Battle Creek Bombers	Mankato MoonDogs
2012	La Crosse Loggers	Mankato MoonDogs
2013	Madison Mallards (2)	Duluth Huskies
2014	Lakeshore Chinooks	Mankato MoonDogs
2015	Kenosha Kingfish	St. Cloud Rox
2016	Wisconsin Rapids Rafters	Eau Claire Express
2017	St. Cloud Rox (4)	Battle Creek Bombers
2018	Fond du Lac Dock Spiders	Duluth Huskies
2019	Traverse City Pit Spitters	Eau Claire Express
2020	No official league champion. See this page for detailed information.	---
2021	Traverse City Pit Spitters (2)	St. Cloud Rox
2022	Kalamazoo Growlers	Duluth Huskies
2023	Green Bay Rockers	St. Cloud Rox
2024	Kalamazoo Growlers (2)	La Crosse Loggers
2025	Green Bay Rockers (2)	Duluth Huskies
2026	Royal Oak Leprechauns	St. Cloud Rox

=== Softball champions ===
Season	Champion	Runner-up	Result
2024	Mankato Habaneros	None (best regular-season record)	31-11
2025	Madison Night Mares	Minot Honeybees	2-0
2026	Madison Night Mares	Wausau Ignite	2-0

== Notable alumni ==
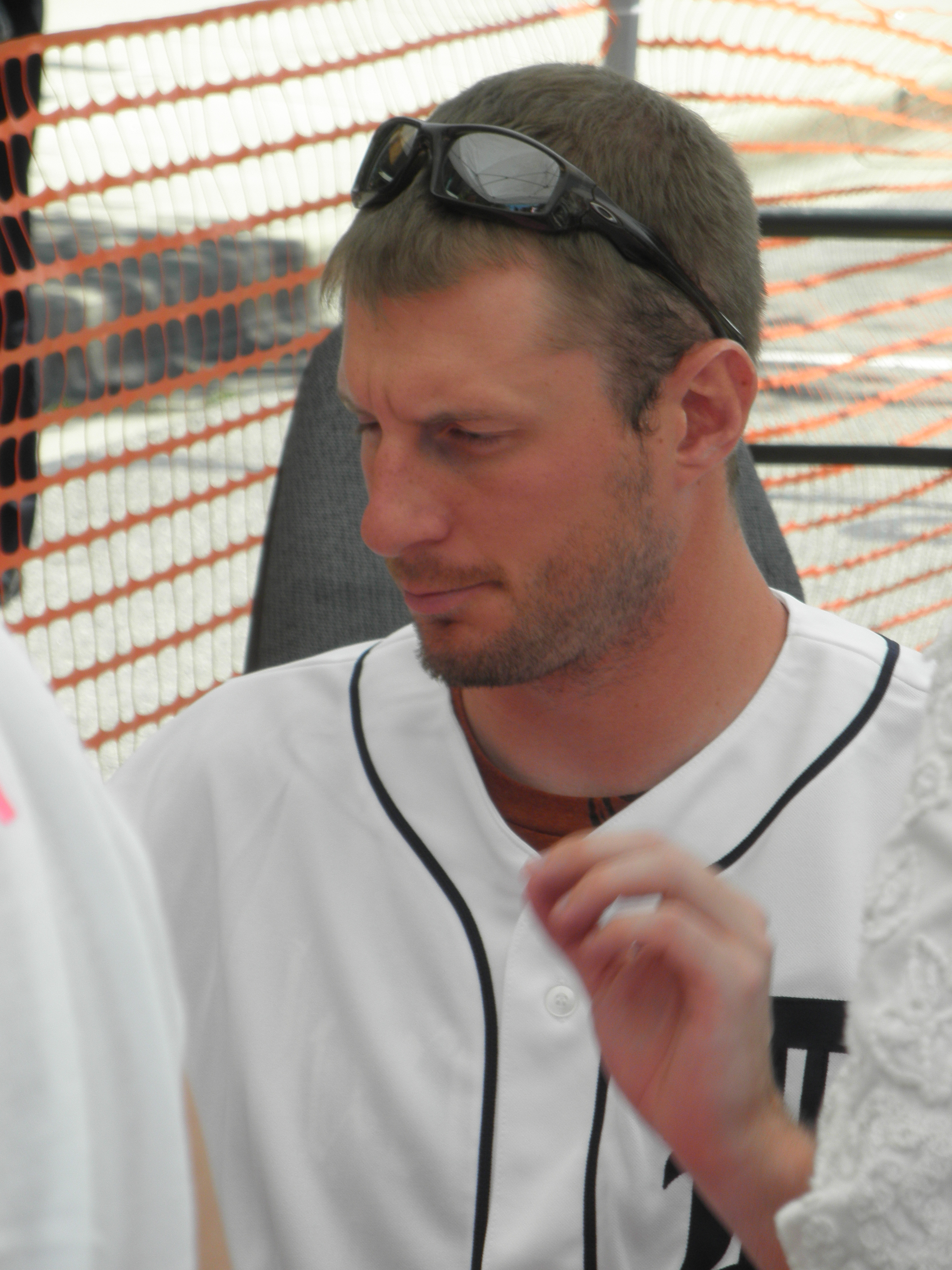
Max Scherzer

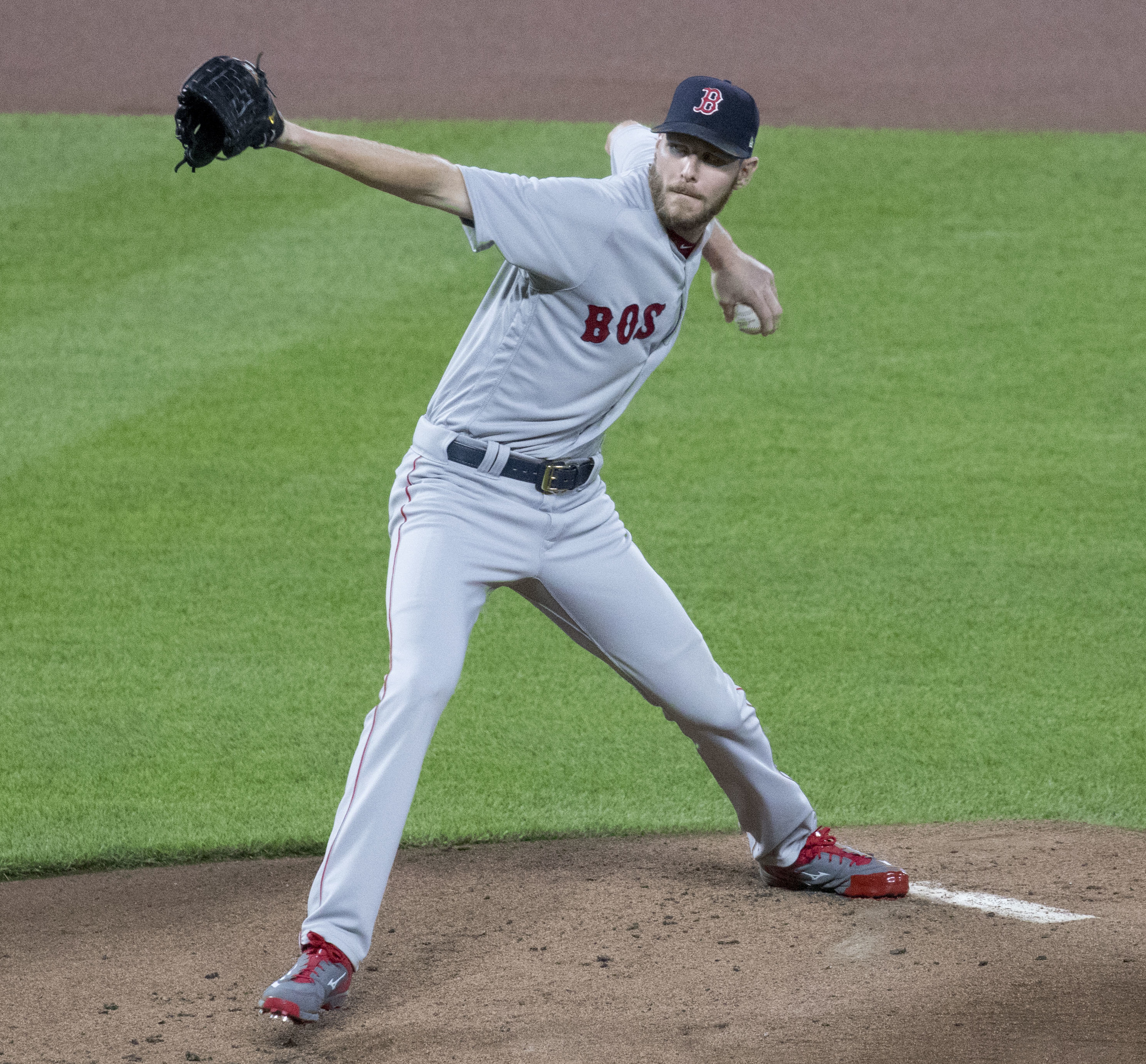
Chris Sale

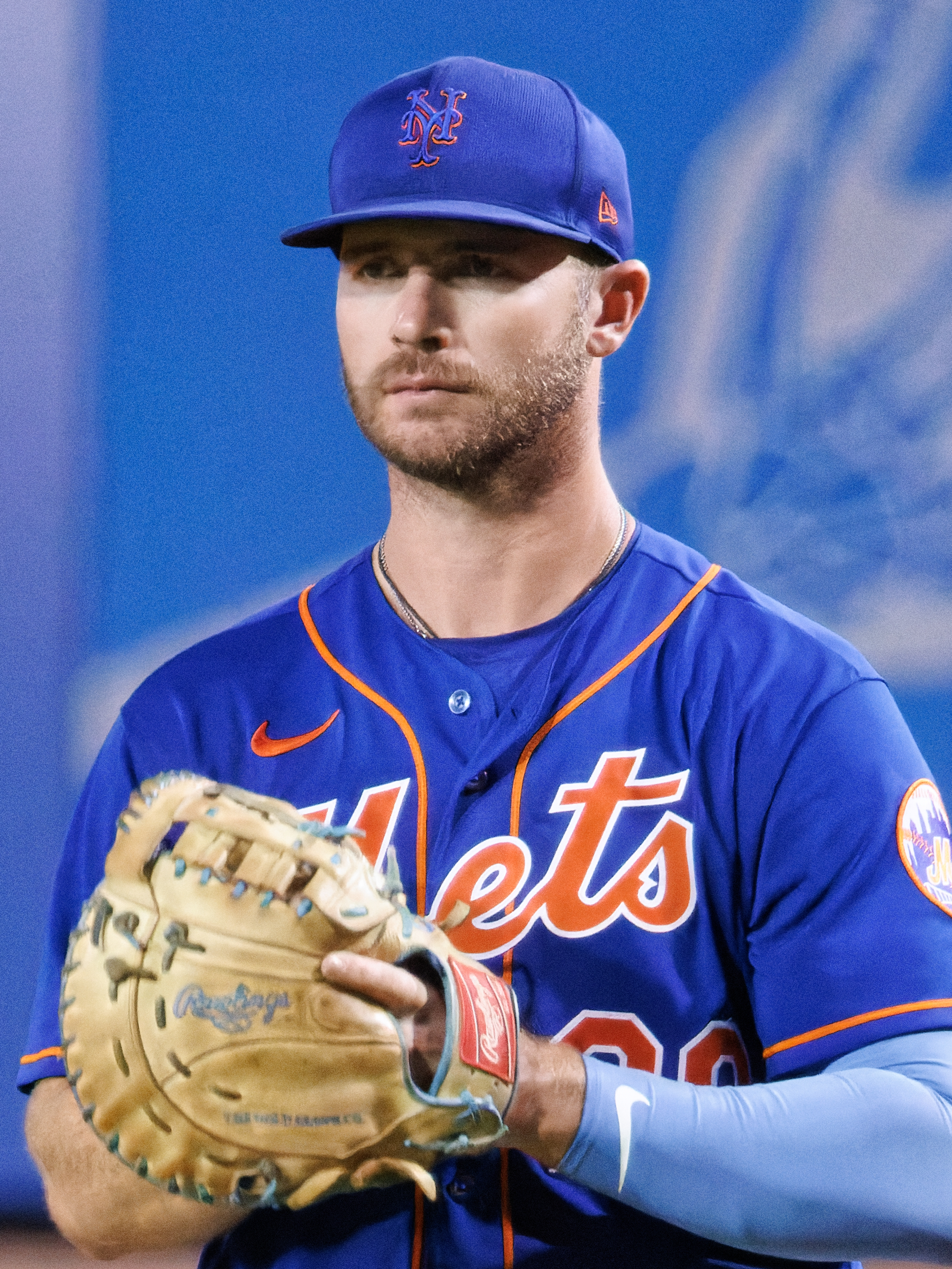
Pete Alonso

As of the end of the 2026 MLB season, 437 former Northwoods League players have appeared in Major League Baseball. The following is a list of notable standout players.

- Pete Alonso, Madison Mallards, 2014
- Harrison Bader, Lakeshore Chinooks, 2013
- Drake Baldwin, K-Town Bobbers, 2020; Madison Mallards, 2021
- Clint Barmes, Kenosha Kroakers, 1998; Waterloo Bucks, 1999
- Austin Barnes, St. Cloud River Bats, 2010
- Michael Busch, St. Cloud Rox, 2017
- Kole Calhoun, Eau Claire Express, 2007–09
- Noah Cameron, Willmar Stingers, 2020
- Mark Canha, St. Cloud River Bats, 2008
- Matt Chapman, La Crosse Loggers, 2012
- Denzel Clarke, Kokomo Jackrabbits, 2019
- Ernie Clement, Wisconsin Rapids Rafters, 2015
- Allen Craig, Alexandria Beetles, 2003/2005
- Brandon Crawford, Mankato MoonDogs, 2005
- Paul DeJong, Wisconsin Woodchucks, 2014
- Caleb Durbin, Fond du Lac Dock Spiders, 2020-21
- Andre Ethier, Rochester Honkers, 2002
- Mitch Garver, St. Cloud River Bats, 2010–11
- Tony Gonsolin, Madison Mallards, 2015
- Curtis Granderson, Mankato Mashers, 2001
- Mitch Haniger, Green Bay Bullfrogs, 2009
- Nico Hoerner, Madison Mallards, 2016
- Zach McKinstry, Waterloo Bucks, 2015
- Chase Meidroth, Kokomo Jackrabbits, 2021
- Mark Melancon, Duluth Huskies, 2004
- Garrett Mitchell, Mankato MoonDogs, 2018
- Pat Neshek, Wisconsin Woodchucks, 2000
- Lars Nootbaar, La Crosse Loggers, 2016
- Juan Pierre, Manitowoc Skunks, 1996
- Kevin Pillar, Wisconsin Woodchucks, 2010
- Chris Sale, La Crosse Loggers, 2008
- Max Scherzer, La Crosse Loggers, 2004
- Marcus Semien, Alexandria Beetles, 2009-10
- George Sherrill, Kenosha Kroakers, 1997
- Chandler Simpson, Fond du Lac Dock Spiders, 2021
- Drew Smyly, Duluth Huskies, 2009
- Bryson Stott, Wisconsin Rapids Rafters, 2017
- Matt Strahm, Rochester Honkers, 2011
- Jose Trevino, Madison Mallards, 2012
- Louis Varland, Willmar Stingers, 2017–18
- Daulton Varsho, Eau Claire Express, 2015–16
- Alex Vesia, Mankato MoonDogs, 2016
- Jeff Weaver, Dubuque Mud Puppies, 1995
- JJ Wetherholt, Madison Mallards, 2022
- Josh Willingham, Southern Minny Stars, 1998–99
- Jacob Wilson, Mankato MoonDogs, 2021
- Jordan Zimmermann, Eau Claire Express, 2006
- Ben Zobrist, Wisconsin Woodchucks, 2003
