= Dinky line =

Dinky line (or simply "Dinky") is a nickname sometimes used to describe a short railroad line, usually operated with short trains. The term may come from "dinkey", which is "a small locomotive for hauling cars, shunting, etc. in a railroad yard" and is driven by "Rail Yard Engineers, Dinkey Operators, and Hostlers".

The following have been called dinky lines:

- The Ames and College Railway, a steam train line from 1891 through 1907 linking Ames, Iowa, with Iowa Agricultural College
- The B&O Main Line around Sykesville, Maryland, called both the "Dinkey" and the "Dinky."
- Chicago and Tomah Railroad in Wisconsin, later a branch of the C&NW. Particularly the section between Fennimore and Woodman which was retained as a narrow gauge operation until its closure.
- Columbia-Liberty Iron Company in Woodstock, Virginia
- Cynwyd Line, Southeastern Pennsylvania Transportation Authority
- H. & H. Railroad, the "shortest railroad in the world", connected Stanwood and East Stanwood, Washington.
- Mount Airy and Eastern Railroad was a narrow gauge (3-foot) railroad connecting Mount Airy, North Carolina, with Kibler Valley in Patrick County, Virginia, from 1899 to 1918, a distance of 19.25 miles along the Ararat River. A quarry line joined at "the Junction" near Riverside Drive.
- New Canaan Branch, Metro-North Railroad
- Orlando and Winter Park Railway
- Princeton Branch, New Jersey Transit
- St. Louis and Alton Railroad, between Alton and Grafton, Illinois, operated by Illinois Terminal.
