= Coal City, Illinois =

- Village
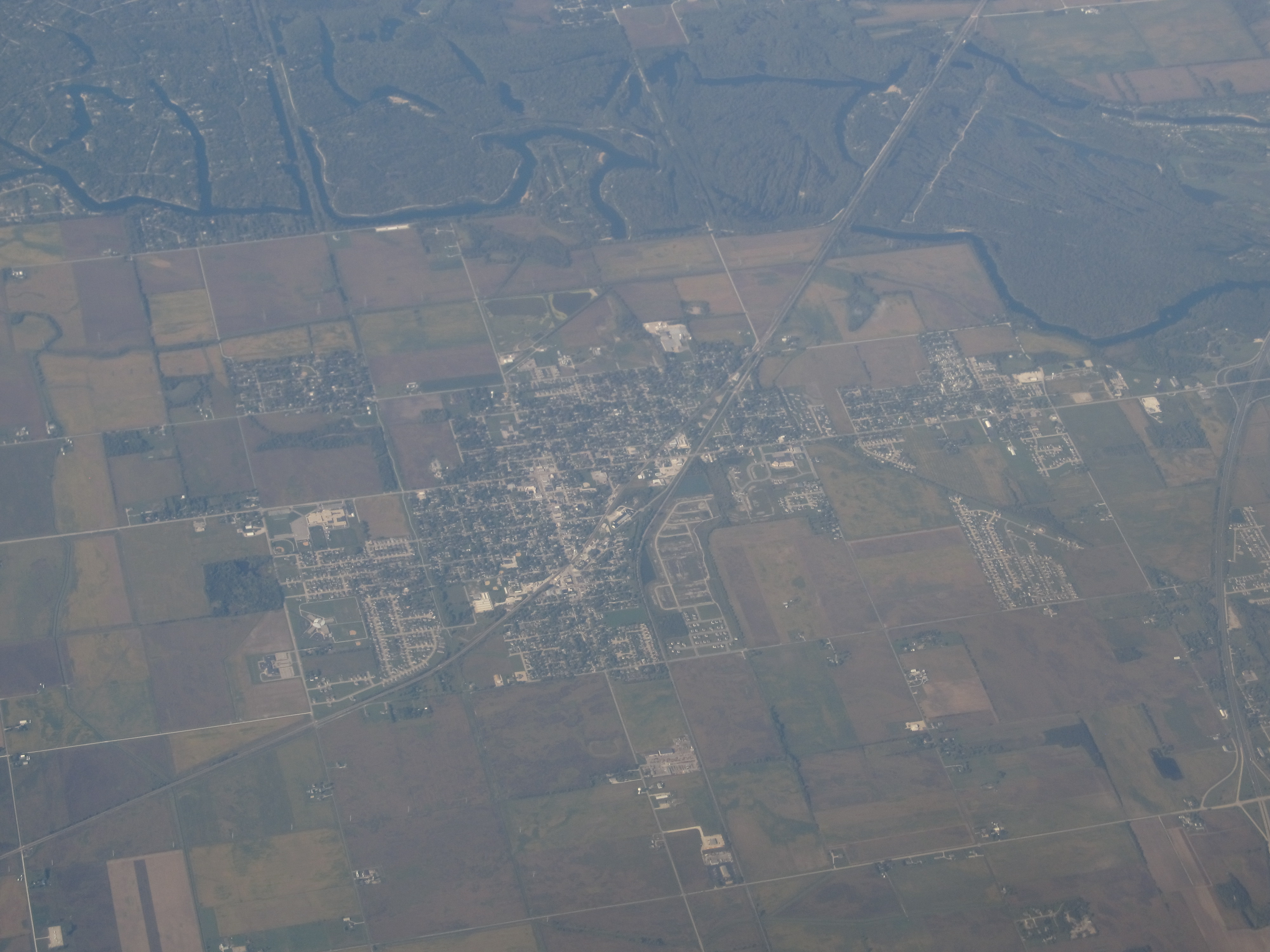
- Aerial view of Coal City; Diamond, Illinois (right), is adjacent to Coal City

- Flag Seal

- Location within counties and Illinois
- Coordinates: 41°16′17″N 88°16′39″W
- Country: United States
- State: Illinois
- County: Grundy, Will
- Townships: Braceville · Felix

Area
  - Total: 5.88 sq mi (15.23 km^{2})
  - Land: 5.77 sq mi (14.94 km^{2})
  - Water: 0.11 sq mi (0.29 km^{2})
- Elevation: 568 ft (173 m)

Population (2020)
  - Total: 5,705
  - Density: 989.2/sq mi (381.94/km^{2})
- Time zone: UTC-6 (CST)
  - Summer (DST): UTC-5 (CDT)
- ZIP code: 60416
- Area codes: 815, 779
- FIPS code: 17-15170
- GNIS feature ID: 2398586
- Website: coalcity-il.gov

Coal City is a village in Grundy and Will Counties in the U.S. state of Illinois. It is considered a fringe town of the Chicago metropolitan area. The population was 5,705 at the 2020 census.

== History ==
Coal City was incorporated in 1870, named for coal mines in the vicinity that were built following the 1820 discovery of large coal reserves. During the 20th century, coal mining operations in the area declined, with the local economy being driven more by growth in manufacturing and the construction of nearby power plants, including Dresden Nuclear Power Plant and Braidwood Nuclear Generating Station.

=== 2013 tornado ===
A tornado passed through Coal City damaging a number of homes during the tornado outbreak of November 17, 2013. The National Weather Service rated the tornado an EF2. The max wind speed was rated at 122 miles per hour, with a reported path length of 12.9 miles. 3 injuries would be recorded.

=== 2015 tornado ===
A confirmed EF3 tornado passed through Coal City during the outbreak of storms and tornadoes on Monday, June 22, 2015. The tornado touched down near Morris, Illinois, before entering Coal City, damaging and destroying a number of homes and businesses. According to the National Weather Service, winds reached 160 miles per hour as the tornado touched down, making it the most powerful tornado to hit the region since the Plainfield, IL tornado in August 1990.

== Geography ==
According to the 2021 census gazetteer files, Coal City has a total area of 5.88 square miles (15.23 km^{2}), of which 5.77 square miles (14.94 km^{2}) (or 98.11%) is land and 0.11 square miles (0.28 km^{2}) (or 1.89%) is water.

== Demographics ==
Historical population
Census	Pop.	Note	%±
1890	1,672		—
1900	2,607		55.9%
1910	2,667		2.3%
1920	1,744		−34.6%
1930	1,637		−6.1%
1940	1,852		13.1%
1950	2,220		19.9%
1960	2,852		28.5%
1970	3,040		6.6%
1980	3,028		−0.4%
1990	3,907		29.0%
2000	4,797		22.8%
2010	5,587		16.5%
2020	5,705		2.1%
U.S. Decennial Census

=== Racial and ethnic composition ===
Coal City village, Illinois – Racial and ethnic composition Note: the US Census treats Hispanic/Latino as an ethnic category. This table excludes Latinos from the racial categories and assigns them to a separate category. Hispanics/Latinos may be of any race.
Race / Ethnicity (NH = Non-Hispanic)	Pop 2000	Pop 2010	Pop 2020	% 2000	% 2010	% 2020
White alone (NH)	4,662	5,237	5,039	97.19%	93.74%	88.33%
Black or African American alone (NH)	6	17	33	0.13%	0.30%	0.58%
Native American or Alaska Native alone (NH)	11	10	14	0.23%	0.18%	0.25%
Asian alone (NH)	1	19	19	0.02%	0.34%	0.33%
Native Hawaiian or Pacific Islander alone (NH)	1	1	0	0.02%	0.02%	0.00%
Other race alone (NH)	0	3	11	0.00%	0.05%	0.19%
Mixed race or Multiracial (NH)	25	37	188	0.52%	0.66%	3.30%
Hispanic or Latino (any race)	91	263	401	1.90%	4.71%	7.03%
Total	4,797	5,587	5,705	100.00%	100.00%	100.00%

=== 2020 census ===
As of the 2020 census, Coal City had a population of 5,705 and 1,297 families.

The median age was 38.4 years. 24.1% of residents were under the age of 18 and 15.0% of residents were 65 years of age or older. For every 100 females there were 102.4 males, and for every 100 females age 18 and over there were 98.4 males age 18 and over.

96.4% of residents lived in urban areas, while 3.6% lived in rural areas.

There were 2,286 households in Coal City, of which 32.1% had children under the age of 18 living in them. Of all households, 47.6% were married-couple households, 19.4% were households with a male householder and no spouse or partner present, and 24.2% were households with a female householder and no spouse or partner present. About 28.2% of all households were made up of individuals and 11.2% had someone living alone who was 65 years of age or older.

There were 2,418 housing units, of which 5.5% were vacant. The homeowner vacancy rate was 1.4% and the rental vacancy rate was 7.3%.

=== Income and poverty ===
The median income for a household in the village was $75,108, and the median income for a family was $97,695. Males had a median income of $66,654 versus $40,755 for females. The per capita income for the village was $36,011. About 3.9% of families and 6.1% of the population were below the poverty line, including 4.1% of those under age 18 and 4.6% of those age 65 or over.

== Education ==
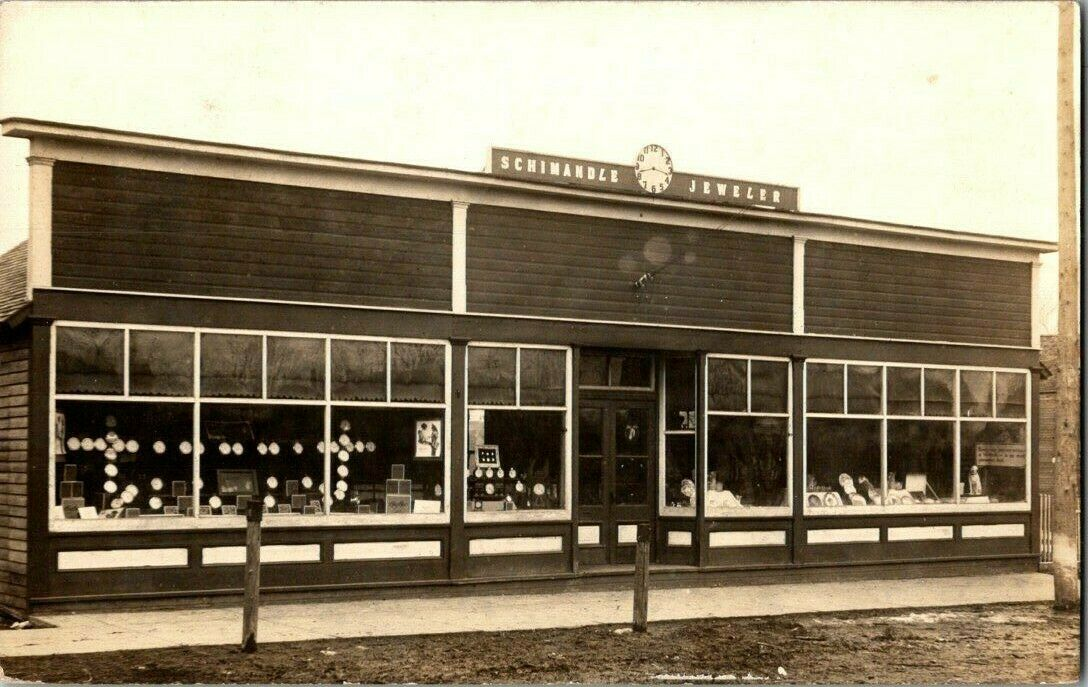
A store in Coal City, Illinois was shown on a real photo postcard mailed on September 1, 1914

All portions of Coal City are served by Coal City Community Unit School District 1.

There are five schools and a unit office in the school district. The Coal City Early Childhood Center services grades PK through 1st. The Coal City Elementary School services grades 2 and 3. The Coal City Intermediate School serves grades 4 and 5. Coal City Middle School has grades 6–8. Coal City High School has grades 9–12.

Coal City is the home of the Coal City High School 2010 IHSA State Champion Softball team. Coal City also won a state championship in football in 1993.

== Transportation ==
It is served by Interstate 55. The Santa Fe Railway formerly served Coal City at Coal City Station.

== Notable people ==
- John R. Fronek, member of the Wisconsin State Assembly and farmer; lived in Coal City
- William E. Somerville, early aviation engineer, businessman and mayor.
