= New Buffalo Area Schools =

School district in Michigan

Address
- 1112 East Clay Street New Buffalo, Berrien County, Michigan, 49117; United States

District information
- Motto: Every student. Every day.
- Grades: PreKindergarten–12
- Superintendent: Adam Bowen
- Schools: 3
- Budget: $22,209,000 2022–2023 expenditures
- NCES District ID: 2625140

Students and staff
- Students: 516 (2024–2025)
- Teachers: 49.3 (on an FTE basis) (2024–2025)
- Staff: 124.3 FTE (2024–2025)
- Student–teacher ratio: 10.47 (2024–2025)
- District mascot: Bison

Other information
- Website: www.nbas.org

New Buffalo Area Schools is a public school district in Berrien County, in the Michiana region of Michigan. It serves New Buffalo, Grand Beach, Michiana, and parts of the townships of Chikaming and New Buffalo.

== History ==
A five-room school was built in the 1870s and served New Buffalo until it burned down in late August 1915. The school was rebuilt in 1916.

A new school, called a "consolidated" school because it served several outlying districts as well as New Buffalo, opened in fall 1931. It was expanded in 1959 and 1965. A dedicated elementary school opened in fall 1959.

The current New Buffalo Middle/High School opened in fall 2001. Middle and high school students use separate parts of the building. The previous secondary school was sold to a real estate developer that same year. A STEAM (Science, Technology, Engineering, Arts, & Mathematics) building across Clay Street from the high school was dedicated in December 2022.

== Schools ==
Schools in New Buffalo Area Schools
School	Address	Notes
New Buffalo Middle/High School	1112 East Clay Street, New Buffalo	Grades 6–12
New Buffalo Elementary	12291 Lubke Road, New Buffalo	Grades PreK-5
