= List of Art Deco architecture in the United States =

This is a list of notable examples of the Art Deco architectural style in the United States.

== Alabama ==
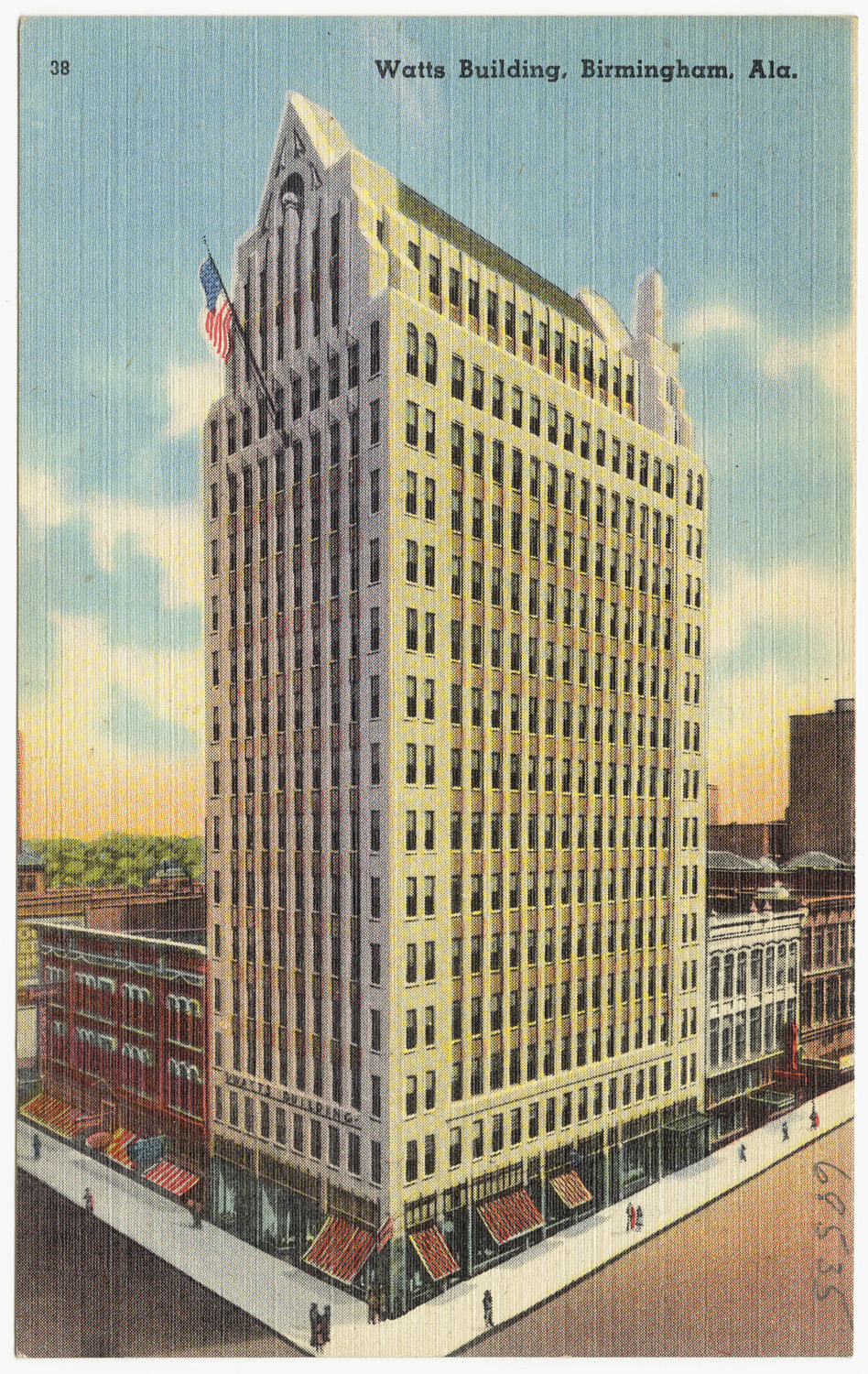
Watts Building, Birmingham, Alabama

Pitman Theatre, Gadsden, Alabama

Building	Historic District	Location	Date	Reference
125 and 127 Dauphin Street (former McCrory's 5 & 10)	Dauphin Street Historic District	Mobile	1924	
Alabama Power Company		Birmingham	1926	
Alabama Theatre		Birmingham	1927	
Azalea Theatre		Mobile	1938	
B. B. Comer Memorial Library		Sylacauga	1936	
Bama Theatre		Tuscaloosa	1937	
Bankhead Tunnel		Mobile	1941	
Birmingham City Hall		Birmingham	1956	
Carver Cinema	Fourth Avenue Historic District	Birmingham	1941	
Center Theater		Huntsville	1947	
City Hall		Fairfield	1945	
Crittenden Building		Birmingham	1924	
Denny Chimes, University of Alabama		Tuscaloosa	1929	
Dothan High School		Dothan	1939	
Federal Reserve Bank of Atlanta Birmingham Branch		Birmingham	1926	
Firestone Tire and Rubber Building	Automotive Historic District	Birmingham	1937	
Fort Nash House		Decatur	1939	
Fort Payne City Hall	Fort Payne Main Street Historic District	Fort Payne	1941	
Freedom Rides Museum (former Greyhound Bus Station)		Montgomery	1951	
Gadsden Fire Station	Alabama City Wall Street Historic District	Gadsden	1936	
Henderson National Bank		Huntsville	1948	
Hope International LLC (former Bank of Ensley and US Steel offices), Ensley		Birmingham	1928	
Huntsville Community Theater (former Town Theatre)		Huntsville	1947	
International Longshoreman's Association Hall		Mobile	1936	
International Longshoreman's Association Hall		Mobile	1936	
Jefferson County Courthouse		Birmingham	1929	
John Archibald Campbell United States Courthouse		Mobile	1935	
Joseph Loveman & Loeb Department Store		Birmingham	1934	
Kress Building		Huntsville	1931	
Lamar County Courthouse		Vernon	1931	
Mason Building		Huntsville	1927	
Mobile Press-Register Building		Mobile	1919	
Orlando Apartments		Birmingham	1928	
Princess Theatre	New Decatur–Albany Historic District	Decatur	1887, 1941	
Propulsion and Structural Test Facility, Marshall Space Flight Center		Huntsville	1957	
Providence Classical School (former East Clinton Elementary School)		Huntsville	1938	
Railroad Underpass leading to Railroad Park		Birmingham	1931	
Ramsay McCormick Building		Birmingham	1929	
Regions Bank Building		Mobile	1929	
Ritz Theatre	Post Office Historic District	Greenville	1935	
Ritz Theatre		Sheffield	1928	
Ritz Theatre		Talladega	1936	
Ritz Theatre	Alabama City Wall Street Historic District	Gadsden	1928	
Rogers Department Store		Florence	1946	
S. H. Kress and Co. Building		Birmingham	1937	
Sammy T's Music Hall		Huntsville	1960	
Scottish Rite Temple		Mobile	1922	
Shoals Theater		Florence		
Southern United Life Building	Jasper Downtown Historic District	Jasper	1940s	
Terry Hutchens Building		Huntsville	1925	
Times Building		Huntsville	1928	
Walker County Courthouse	Jasper Downtown Historic District	Jasper	1932	
Watts Building		Birmingham	1927	
White Palace Cafe	Gadsden Downtown Historic District	Gadsden	1885, 1938	

== Alaska ==
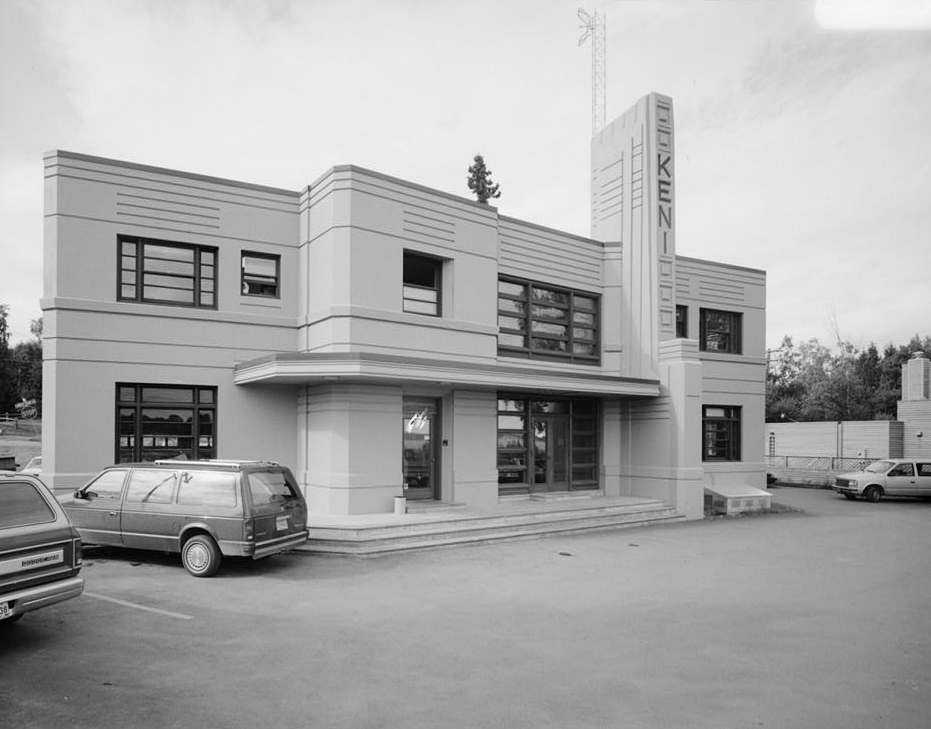
KENI Radio Building, Anchorage, Alaska

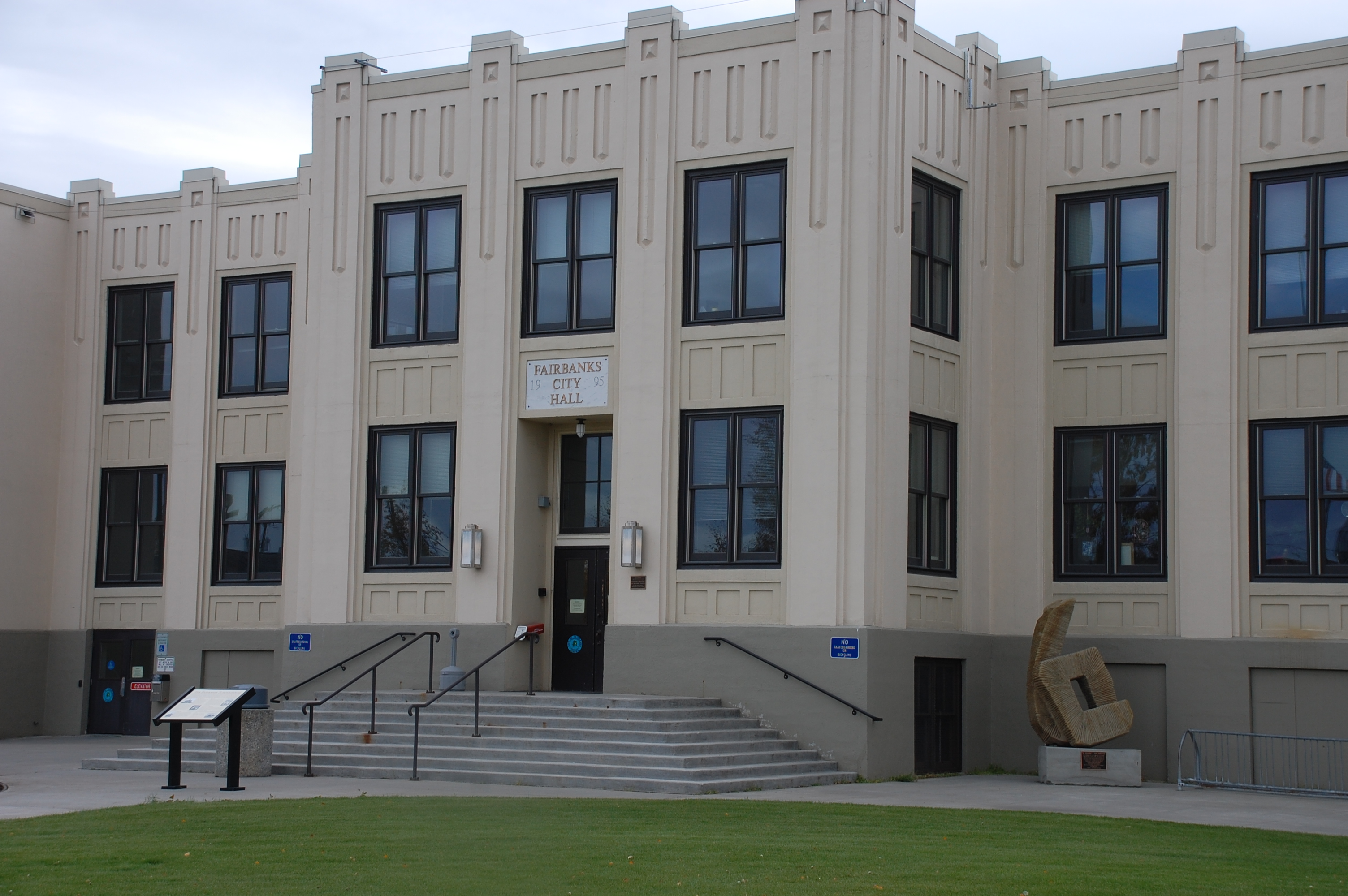
Fairbanks City Hall, Fairbanks, Alaska

Building	Historic District	Location	Date	Ref
Alaska State Capitol		Juneau	1931	
Alaska Electric Light & Power Co	Juneau Downtown Historic District	Juneau	1936	
Anchorage Depot		Anchorage	1942	
Anchorage Hotel		Anchorage	1936	
Baranof Hotel	Juneau Downtown Historic District	Juneau	1939	
Cape Decision Light		Kuiu Island	1932	
Cape Hinchinbrook Light		Hinchinbrook Island	1935	
Cape Spencer Light		Yakuta	1924	
Decker Building	Juneau Downtown Historic District	Juneau	1935	
Fairbanks City Hall		Fairbanks	1934	
Five Finger Islands Light		Frederick Sound	1935	
Fourth Avenue Theater		Anchorage	1947	
Gold Town Nickelodeon		Juneau	1920s	
Gross 20th Century Building	Juneau Downtown Historic District	Juneau	1939	
Holy Family Old Cathedral		Anchorage	1915	
KENI Radio Building		Anchorage	1948	
Ketchikan Federal Building		Ketchikan	1938	
Lacey Street Theatre		Fairbanks	1939	
Loussac-Sogn Building		Anchorage	1947	
Mary Island Light		Revillagigedo Channel	1937	
Masonic Temple		Ketchikan	1947	
Old City Hall		Anchorage	1936	
Old Federal Building		Anchorage	1939	
Old Federal Building		Fairbanks	1933	
Sentinel Island Light, Lynn Canal		Juneau	1935	
Sitka United States Post Office and Court House		Sitka	1938	
Tree Point Light		Revillagigedo Channel	1935	
University of Alaska Fairbanks, Eielson Building		Fairbanks	1934, 1940	

== Arizona ==
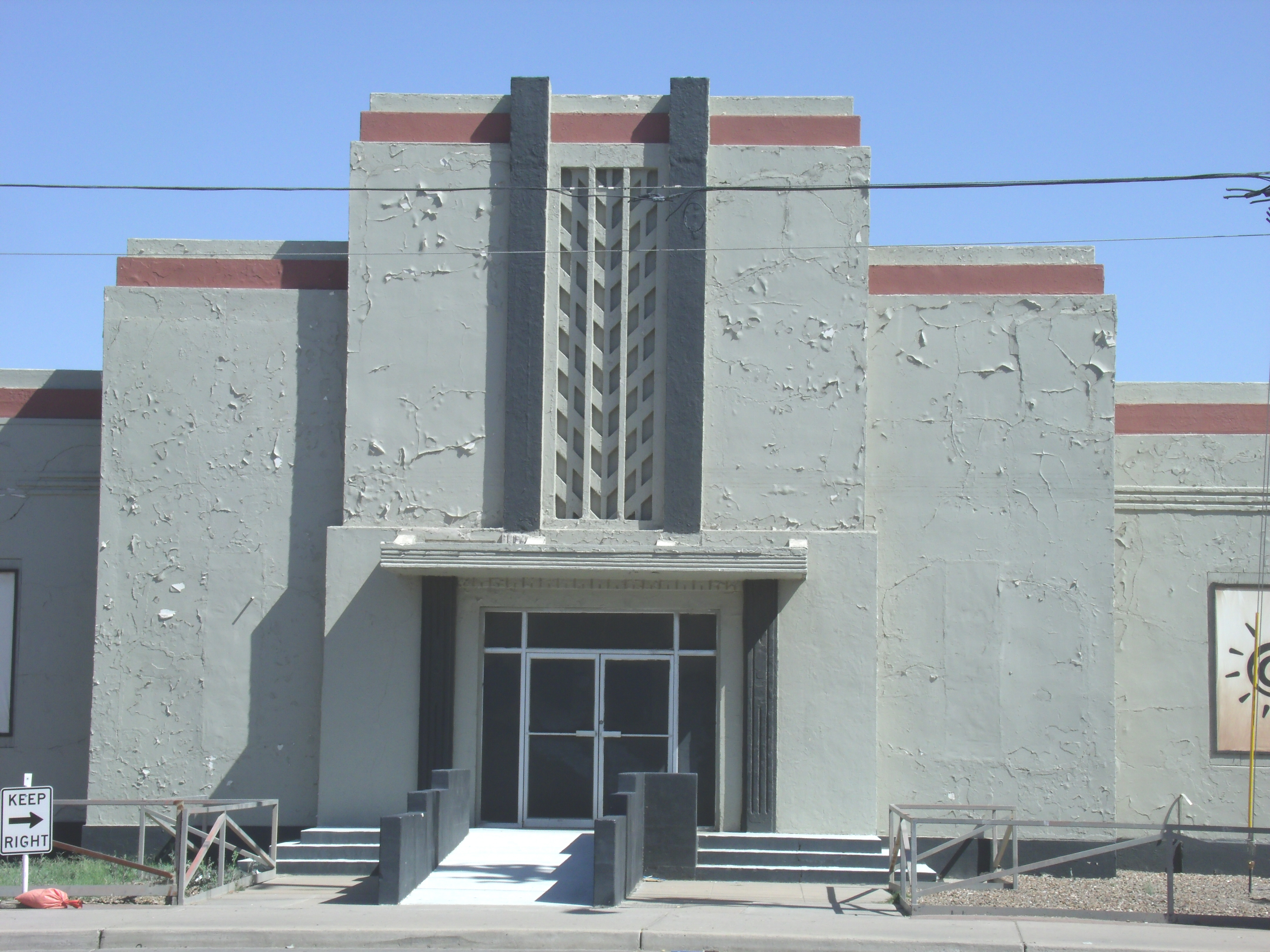
Arizona State Fairgrounds Entrance Building, Phoenix, Arizona

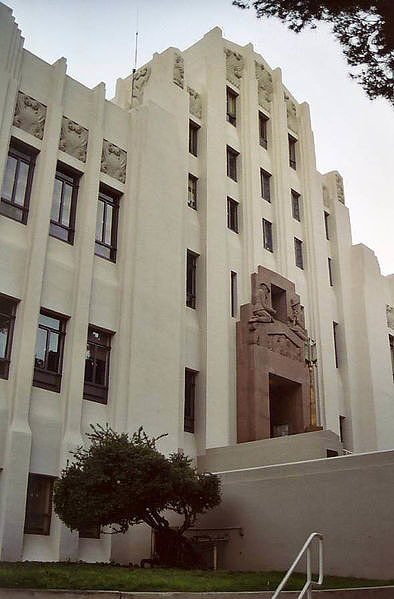
Cochise County Courthouse, Bisbee, Arizona

Building	Historic District	Location	Date	Ref
6th Avenue Hotel–Windsor Hotel		Phoenix	1935	
Apache Lodge		Prescot	1946	
Ardon Hotel/Globe Bakery	Globe Downtown Historic District	Globe	1908	
Arizona Biltmore Hotel		Phoenix	1929	
Arizona State Fairgrounds Entrance Building		Phoenix	1938	
Avon Theatre		Avondale	1946	
B. B. Moeur Activity Building		Tempe	1939	
Babbitt–Polson Building, 314 West Route 66		Williams	1907	
Bragg's Pie Factory		Phoenix	1946	
City-County Building, Phoenix		Phoenix	1928	
Cochise County Courthouse		Bisbee	1931	
Copeland & Tracht Service Station		Phoenix	1935	
Copeland & Tracht Service Station		Phoenix	1935	
Duce Building (former Anchor Manufacturing Company)		Phoenix	1925	
Federal Building		Flagstaff		
Fox Commercial Building		Tucson	1929	
Fox Commercial Building		Tucson	1929	
Fox Tucson Theatre		Tucson	1930	
General Motors Testing Laboratory		Phoenix	1937	
Hanny's		Phoenix	1947	
Hoover Dam		Mohave County	1936	
Hurley Building		Phoenix	1929	
Ice Cream Cone Gas Station		Tucson	1936	
Luhrs Tower		Phoenix	1929	
Maricopa County Courthouse		Phoenix	1929	
Masonic Temple		Kingman	1939	
Masonic Temple		Yuma	1931	
Miami Community Church		Miami	1920	
Moeur Activity Building		Tempe	1939	
Mohave Union High School Gymnasium		Kingman	1936	
Mountain States Telephone and Telegraph Building		Prescott	1933	
Nile Theater		Mesa	1924	
Orpheum Lofts		Phoenix	1930	
Orpheum Theatre		Phoenix	1927	
Phelps Dodge Mercantile Company		Bisbee	1939	
Phoenix Indian School Visitors Center Band Building P		Phoenix	1931	
Professional Building		Phoenix	1932	
Reilly Craft Pizza and Drink (former Reilly Funeral Home)		Tucson	1908	
San Carols Hotel		Yuma	1930	
Security Building		Phoenix	1928	
Vail Building	Railroad Addition Historic District	Flagstaff	1888	
Valley Plumbing & Sheet Metal		Phoenix	1930	
Wickenburg High School Gymnasium		Wickenburg	1934	
Winters Building (former Craig Building)		Phoenix	1931	
WPA Administration Building, Arizona State Fairgrounds		Phoenix	1938	
Zuzu's Petals		Mesa	c. 1920s	

== Arkansas ==
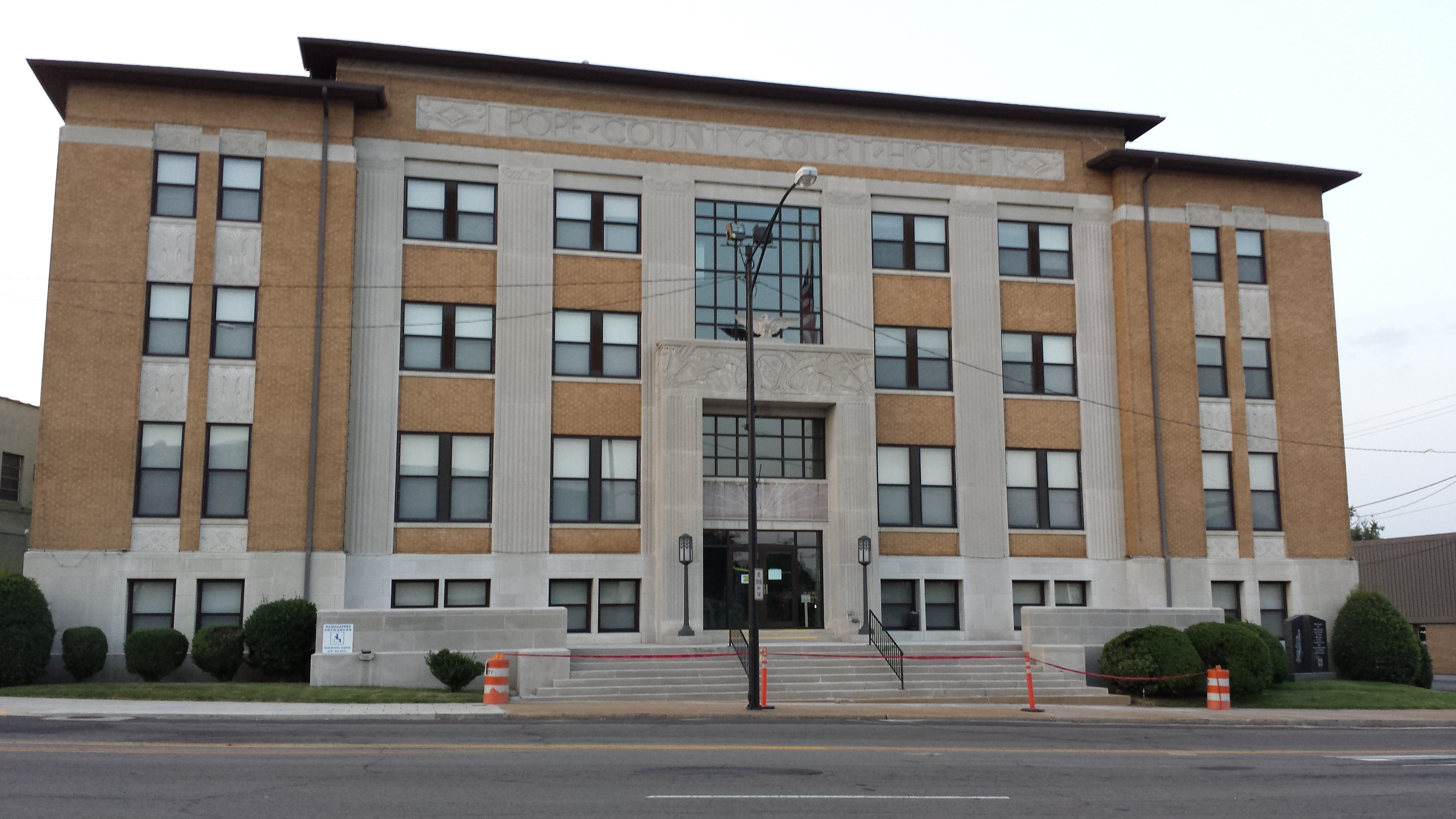
Pope County Courthouse, Russellville, Arkansas

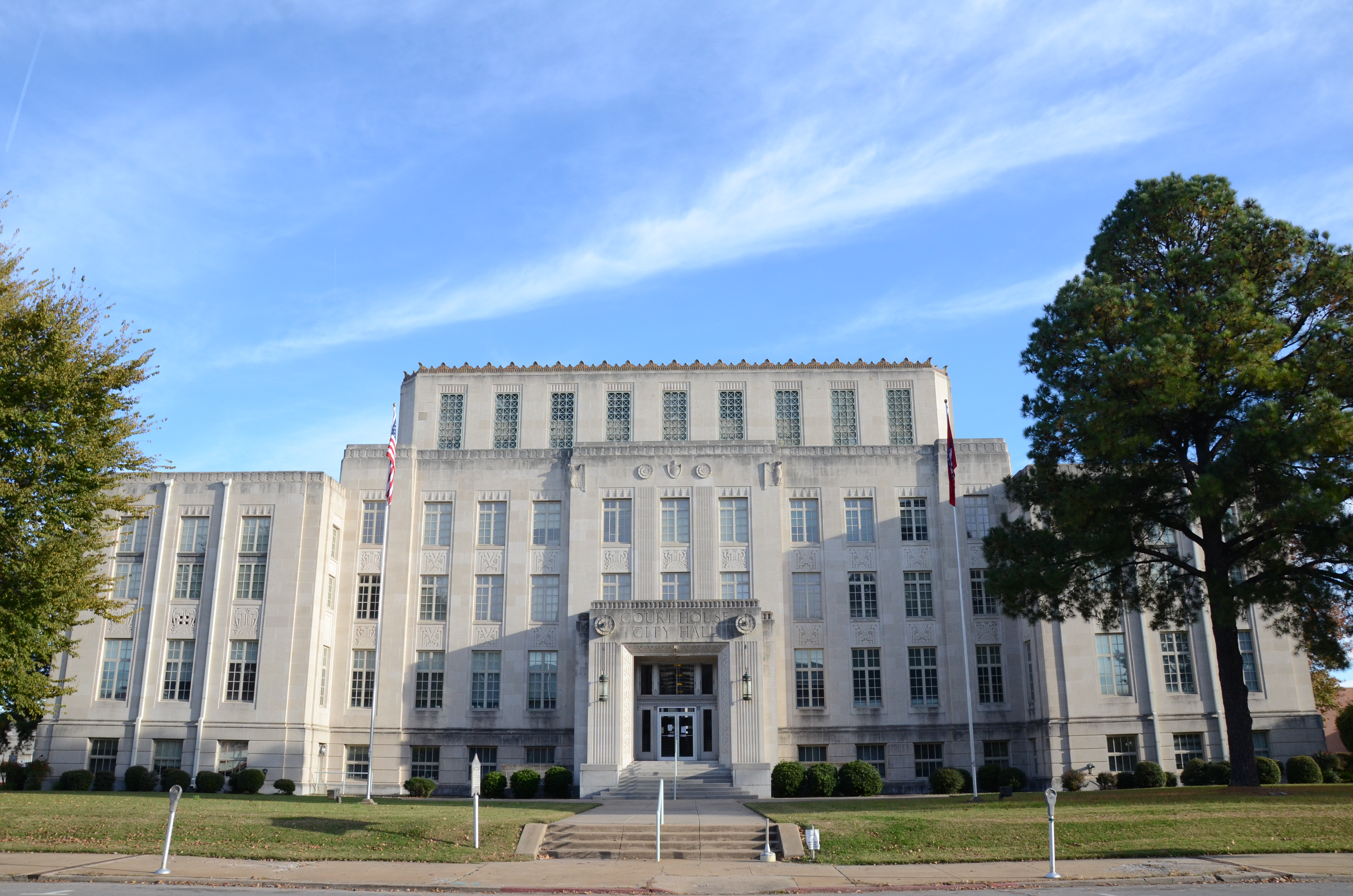
Sebastian County Courthouse, Fort Smith, Arkansas

Building	Historic District	Location	Date	Ref
Apollo Theater		Springdale	1949	
Arkansas County Courthouse-Southern District		De Witt	1931	
Arkansas Louisiana Gas Company Building		Pine Bluff	1950	
Arkansas National Guard Museum		North Little Rock	1931	
Arkansas Theatre		Little Rock		
Arkansas Tuberculosis Sanatorium	Arkansas Tuberculosis Sanatorium Historic District	Booneville	1909	
Baxter County Courthouse		Fayetteville	1943	
Cameo Theater Building	Magnolia Commercial Historic District	Magnolia	1948	
Chicot County Courthouse		Lake Village	1956	
Clarksville National Guard Armory		Clarksville	1930	
Community Center No. 1		Jonesboro	1936	
Conway County Courthouse		Morrilton	1929	
Craighead County Courthouse		Jonesboro	1934	
Crossett Municipal Building		Crossest	1954	
Drew County Courthouse		Monticello	1932	
Dual State Monument		Union County	1931	
Dunbar Magnet Middle School		Little Rock	1929	
El Dorado Junior College Building		El Dorado	1905	
Eudora City Hall		Eudora	1936	
Faulkner County Courthouse		Conway	1936	
Florida Brothers Building		Osceola	1936	
Fort Smith Masonic Temple		Fort Smith	1929	
Greyhound Bus Station		Blytheville		
Helena National Guard Armory		Helena	1937	
Hempstead County Courthouse		Hope	1939	
Historic Wilson Hall, Arkansas State University		Jonesboro	1933	
Hot Spring County Courthouse		Malvern	1936	
Hot Springs National Guard Armory		Hot Springs	1937	
Howard County Courthouse		Nashville	1939	
Izard County Courthouse		Melbourne	1938	
John Brown Watson Memorial Library Building, University of Arkansas at Pine Bluff		Pine Bluff	1939	
Johnson County Courthouse		Clarksville	1935	
Lafayette County Courthouse		Lewisville	1942	
Lee Theater		Little Rock	1939	
Lincoln County Courthouse		Star City	1943	
Little Rock Central High School		Little Rock	1927	
Madison County Courthouse		Huntsville	1939	
Main Theatre		Berryville	1950s	
Malco Theatre		Hot Springs	1935	
Marianna City Hall		Marianna	1929	
Marion County Courthouse		Yellville	1943	
Masonic Temple		El Dorado	1924	
Matthews-Dillon House		Little Rock	1928	
Maxie Theater		Trumann	1948	
Medical Arts Building		Hot Springs	1929	
Melba Theater		Batesville	1940	
Miller County Courthouse		Texarkana	1939	
Morrilton Post Office		Morrilton	1936	
Monticello Post Office		Monticello	1937	
Municipal Building		Monticello	1934	
Municipal Building		El Dorado	1927	
Nabor Theatre		Little Rock	1946	
Nashville Post Office		Nashville	1937	
National Guard Armory		Batesville	1936	
National Guard Armory-Pine Bluff		Pine Bluff	1931	
New Theater		Fort Smith	1911	
Newton County Courthouse		Jasper	1939	
North Little Rock High School		Little Rock	1928	
Ouachita County Courthouse		Camden	1933	
Park Theater		Fayetteville	1940	
Pocahontas Post Office		Pocahontas	1937	
Polk County Courthouse		Mena	1939	
Pope County Courthouse		Russellville		
Portland Bank Portico		Portland	1926	
Price Produce and Service Station		Springdale	1934	
Randolph County Courthouse		Pocahontas	1940	
Rialto Theater		Searcy	1940	
Rison Texaco Service Station		Rison	1926	
Ritz Civic Center (former Gem Theatre)		Blytheville	1917, 1951	
Robinson Center		Little Rock	1939	
Royal Theatre		Benton	1949	
S. H. Kress and Co. Building		Blytheville	1938	
Saint Anthony's Hospital		Morrilton	1935	
Samuel P. Taylor Service Station		Little Rock	1938	
Scott County Courthouse		Waldron	1934	
Sebastian County Courthouse–Fort Smith City Hall		Fort Smith	1937	
St. Michael Hospital (now Miller County Juvenile Court Center)		Texarkana	1945	
Texarkana, Arkansas, Municipal Building		Texarkana	1930	
United States Post Office and Courthouse		Texarkana	1933	
Van Buren County Courthouse		Clinton	1934	
Van Buren Post Office		Van Buren	1936	
Wilson High School Gymnasium		Wilson	1948	
Wallace Building		Little Rock	1928	
Wynne Post Office		Wynne	1936	

== Connecticut ==
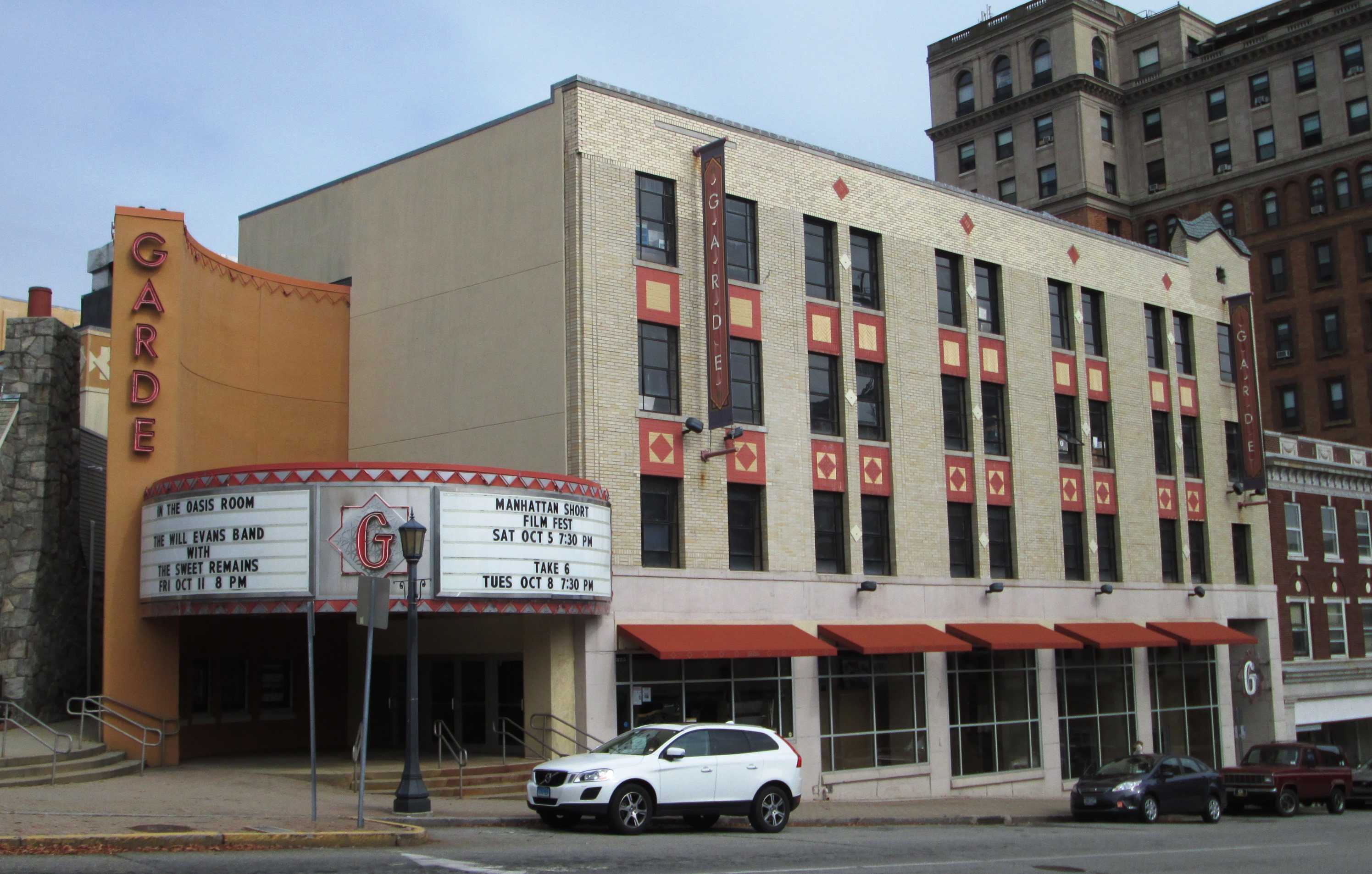
Garde Arts Center, New London, Connecticut

Building	Historic District	Location	Date	Reference
A. C. Peterson Farms		West Hartford	1914	
Adath Israel Synagogue		Middletown	1929	
Aetna Theatre at the Wadsworth Atheneum		Hartford	1934	
Agudas Achim Synagogue		Hebron	1940	
Allen Building		Torrington	1930	
Avery Memorial Building, Wadsworth Atheneum		Hartford		
Bank Street Theater		New Milford	1920, 1937	
Bishop Building		Norwalk	1935	
Branford Block		Branford	1925	
Bridgeport City Trust Building		Bridgeport	1929	
Congregation Beth Israel		West Hartford	1933	
Connecticut State Office Building		Hartford	1931	
Engine Company 9 Fire Station, Southwest Hartford		Southwest Hartford	1937	
French Italian Importing Company		Hamden	1930s	
G. Fox & Company		Hartford	1918	
Garde Arts Center		New London	1926	
Greenwich Fire Headquarters	Greenwich Avenue Historic District	Greenwich	1938	
Greenwich Trust Bank	Greenwich Avenue Historic District	Greenwich	1887, 1931	
Gymnasium (now Windham Recreation Department)		Windham		
Hartford County Building		Hartford	1929	
Hartford Steam Boiler Inspection and Insurance Company		Hartford	1932	
Hilliard Mills		Manchester	1794, 1925	
Hotel Beach (also known as Hotel Barnum)		Bridgeport	1927	
John S. Monagan Federal Building		Waterbury	1931	
Lorraine Building	Main Street Historic District	Bristol	1905, 1930s	
Main Street Diner		Plainville	1957	
North Side Properties Building		Bridgeport	1942	
Olympia Diner		Newington	1950	
O'Rourke's Diner		Middletown	1941	
Polish Falcons Nest 88		New Britain	1920s	
Polish National Home		Hartford	1927	
Rodeph Shalom Synagogue		Bridgeport	1949	
Sedgwick Middle School		West Hartford	1931	
Southern New England Telephone Company Administration Building		New Haven	1938	
Southern New England Telephone Company Building		Hartford	1931	
St. Justin Catholic Church		Hartford	1933	
Steiger Building		Hartford	1927	
Strand Theater		Seymour	1921	
Styletex Building		Meriden	1874, 1935	
The Eli		New Haven	1937	
TheaterWorks		Hartford	1933	
United Illuminating Company Building		Bridgeport	1935	
United States Post Office, Bridgeport Main		Bridgeport	1934	
Warner Theatre		Torrington	1931	
West Haven Armory		West Haven	1932	
White Hall, Western Connecticut State University		Danbury	1925	
William R. Cotter Federal Building		Hartford	1937	
Woolworth Building		Middletown	1939	

== Delaware ==
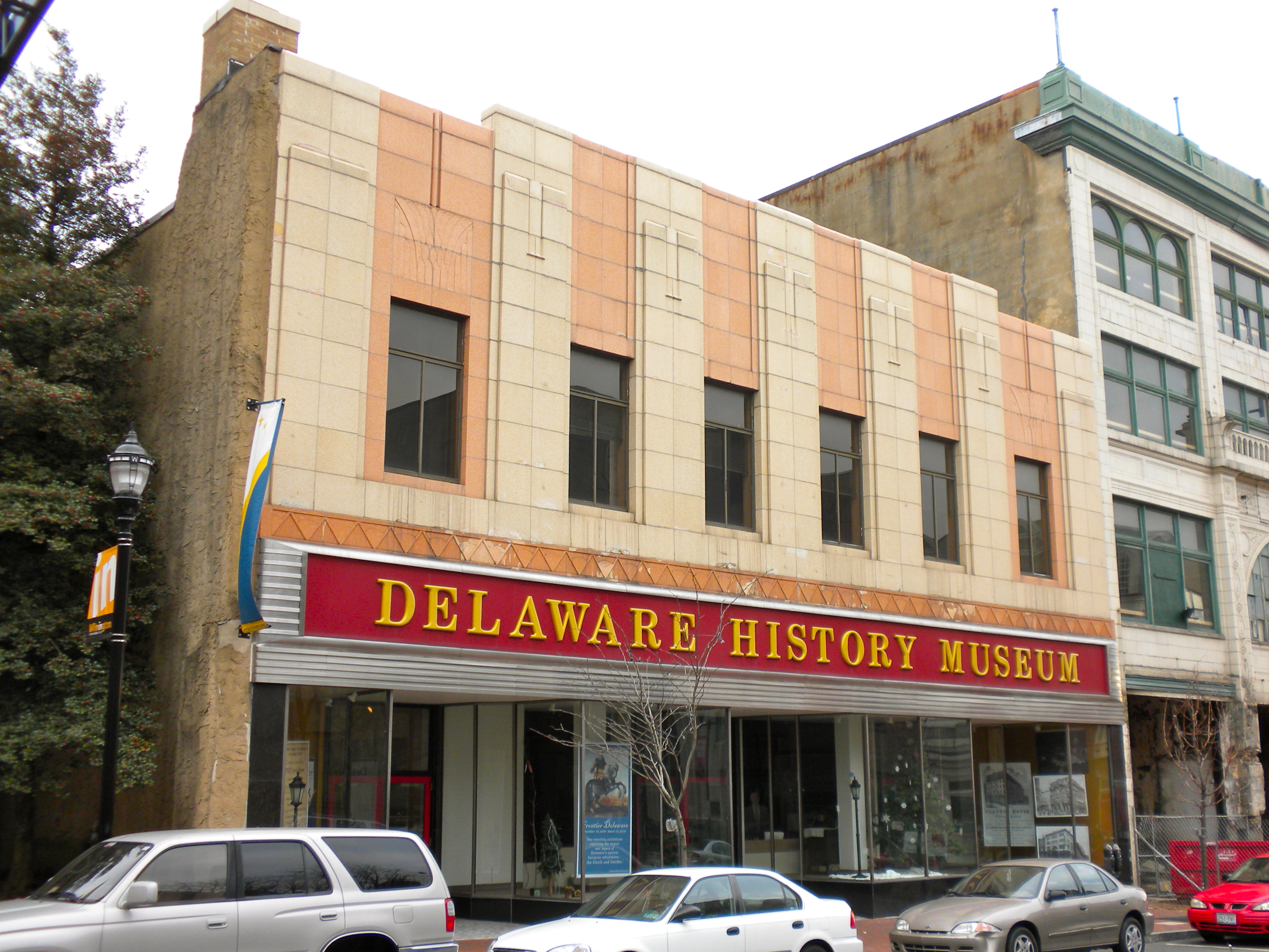
Artisans' Savings Bank, Wilmington, Delaware

Building	Historic District	Location	Date	Reference
Artisans' Savings Bank (now Delaware History Museum)		Wilmington	1930	
Avenue Theater		Rehoboth Beach	1938	
Charles Schagrin Building		Wilmington	1948	
Chevrolet Dealership (now I.G. Burton Auto Showroom)		Milton	1946	
Clayton Theatre		Dagsboro	1948	
Crest Theater (now Foley Hall at St. Matthew's Catholic Church)		Wilmington	1942	
Delaware College of Art and Design		Wilmington	1931	
Dover Opera House interior (now Schwartz Center for the Arts)		Dover	1922	
Mike's Famous Roadside Rest		New Castle	1998	
Milton Theatre		Milton	1910, 1930s	
Parrot House		Rehoboth Beach		
Peoples Bank		Harrington	1929	
Walsmith's Drugs (now Shopping on Rehoboth Avenue)		Rehoboth Beach	1940s	
DiSabatino Building		Wilmington	1937, 1938	
F. W. Woolworth Building		Wilmington	1940	
Max Keil Building, 712 North Market Street		Wilmington	1938	
Nemours Building		Wilmington	1936	
Wilmington Hospital		Wilmington	1940, 1941	
Wilmington Savings Fund Society Building		Wilmington	1920	

== Hawaii ==
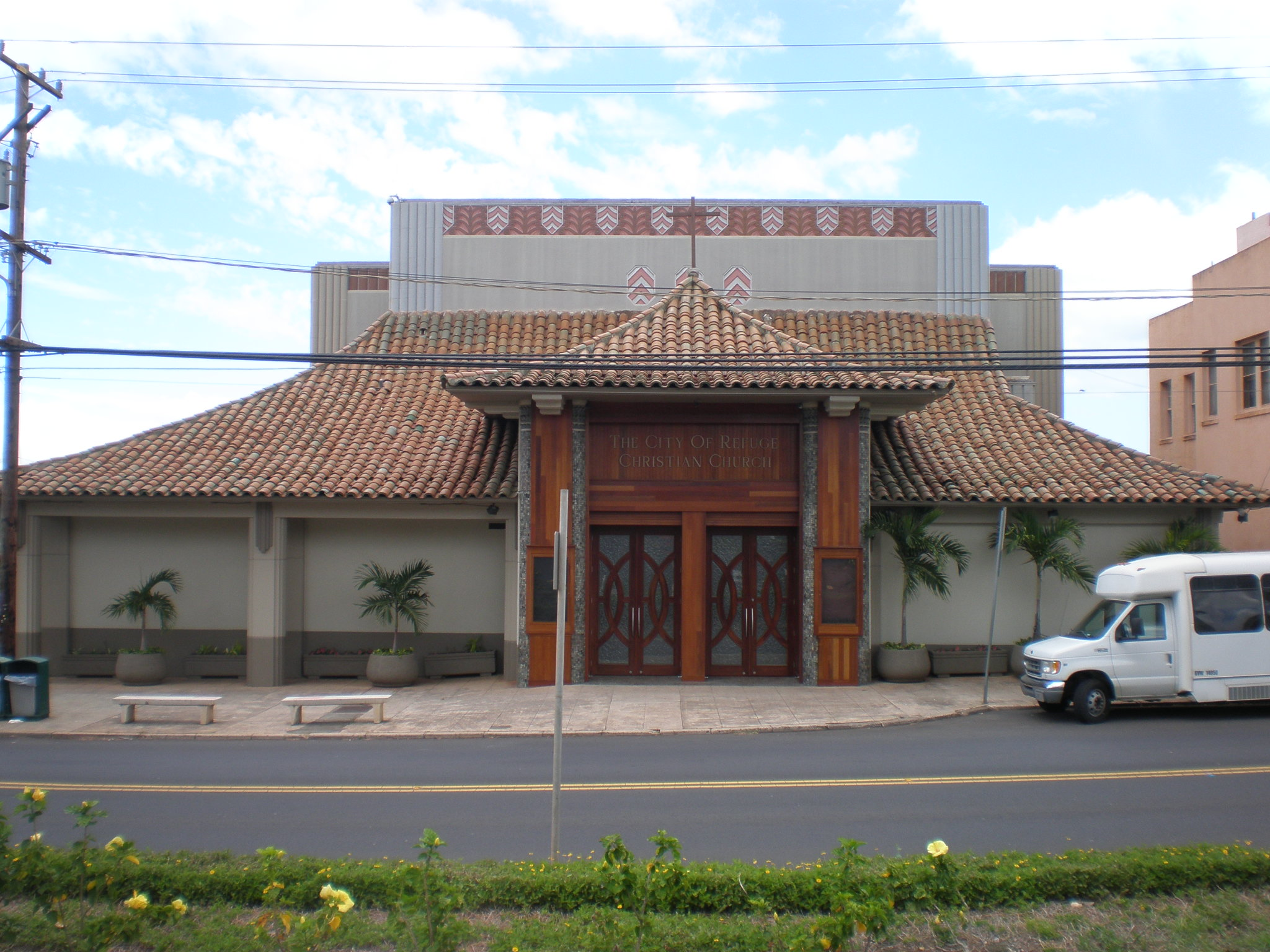
New Waipahu Theater, Waipahu, Hawaii

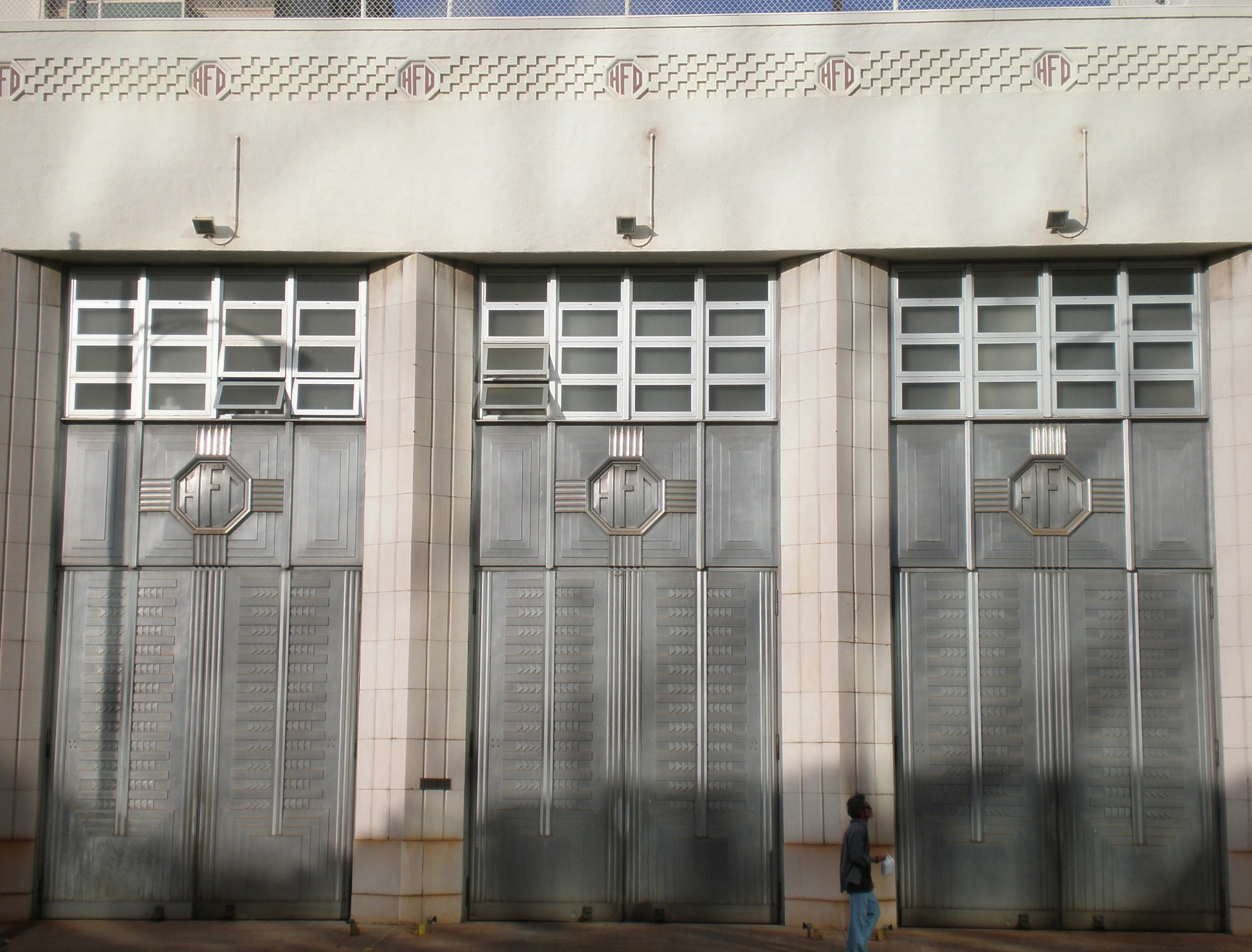
Central Fire Station, Honolulu, Hawaii

Building	Historic District	Location	Date	Reference
Agner R. & Ruth M. Nylen Residence		Honolulu	1930s	
Alexander & Baldwin Building		Honolulu	1929	
Aloha Tower		Honolulu	1926	
C. Brewer Building		Honolulu	1930	
Central Fire Station		Honolulu	1934	
Church of the Crossroads		Honolulu	1923	
Control Tower		Ford Island		
Dillingham Transportation Building lobby		Honolulu	1929	
Fire Station, Naval Station Pearl Harbor		Pearl City	1936	
Gump Building		Honolulu	1929	
Haili's Hawaiian Foods		Honolulu		
Hickham Air Force Base, Pearl Harbor		Honolulu	1941	
Honoka'a People's Theatre		Honoka'a	1930	
Honolulu Museum of Art		Honolulu	1929	
Kewalo Theater		Honolulu	1937	
Leonard's Bakery, Honolulu, 1952		Honolulu	1952	
Mabel Smith Memorial Building		Honolulu	1941	
Mother Waldron Playground, Kaka'ako		Honolulu	1937	
Richardson Theater		Fort Shafter	1948	
Royal Hawaiian Hotel		Honolulu	1927	
Saimin Fountain		Honolulu		
Sgt. Smith Theatre		Wahiawa	1933	
Tripler Army Medical Center		Honolulu	1948	
United States Cinemas (former United States Store)		Hilo	1932	
United States Immigration Office			1934	
Ushijima Store		Kawanui, Kona	1953	
Waimea Theatre		Waimea	1938	
Waiola Congregational Church doorway		Lahaina	1953	

== Maine ==
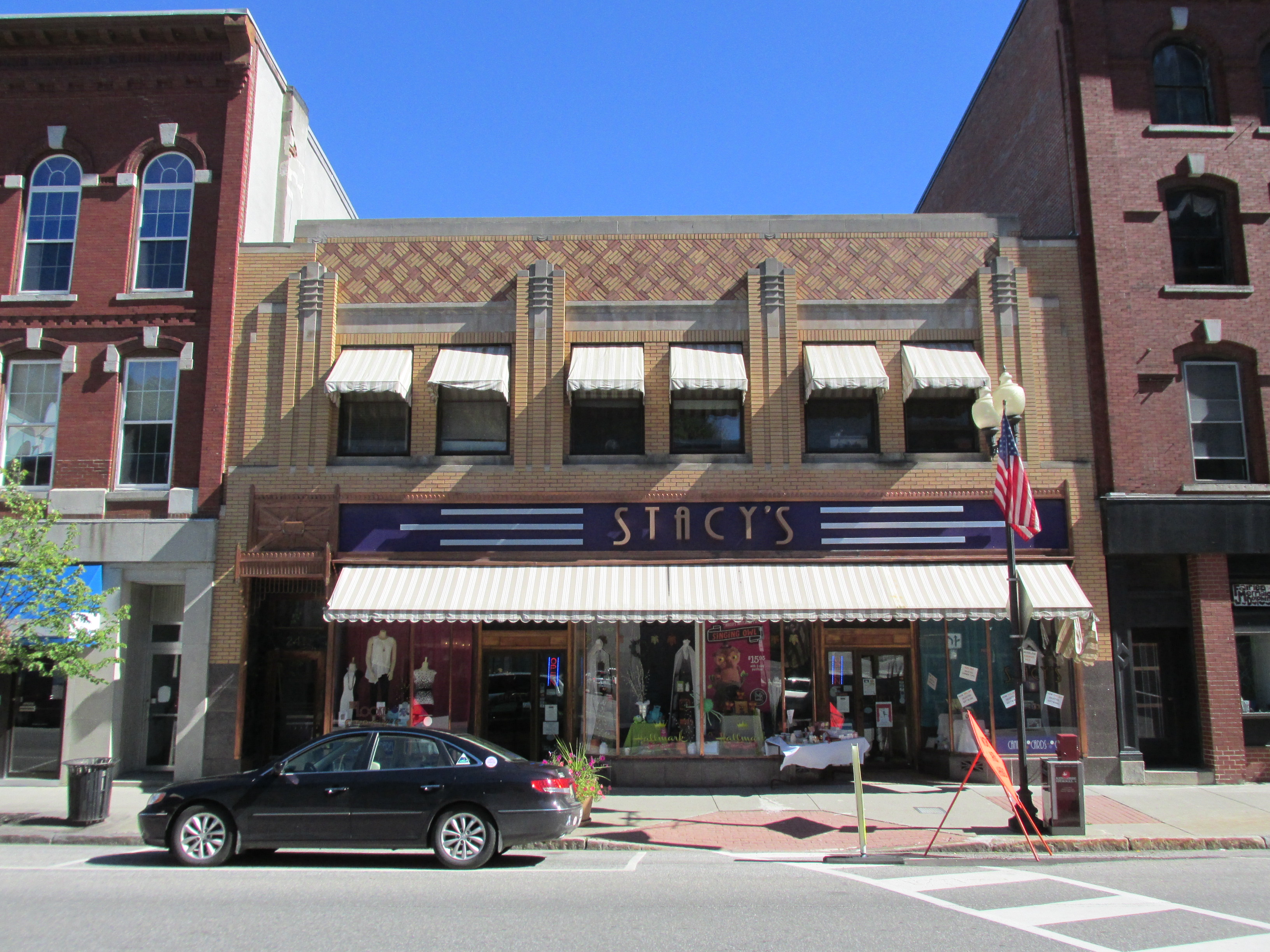
Kresge Building, Augusta, Maine

Building	Historic District	Location	Date	Reference
Bangor Opera House (now Penobscot Theatre Company)		Bangor	1920	
Colonial Theatre		Belfast	1912	
Criterion Theatre		Bar Harbor	1932	
Cyr Building		Waterville	1923	
Federal Trust Company, 25–33 Main Street	Waterville Main Street Historic District	Waterville	1936	
Five County Credit Union Building		Lewiston	1954	
The Grand		Ellsworth	1938	
Kresge Building		Augusta	1932	
Old Brewer High School		Brewer	1926	
Old Waterville High School		Waterville	1912, 1930s	
Professional Building		Waterville	1923	
Saco Central Fire Station		Saco	1939	
Schlotterbeck and Foss Building		Portland	1927	
Strand Theatre		Rockland	1923	
Verizon Building		Bangor	1930	

== Maryland ==
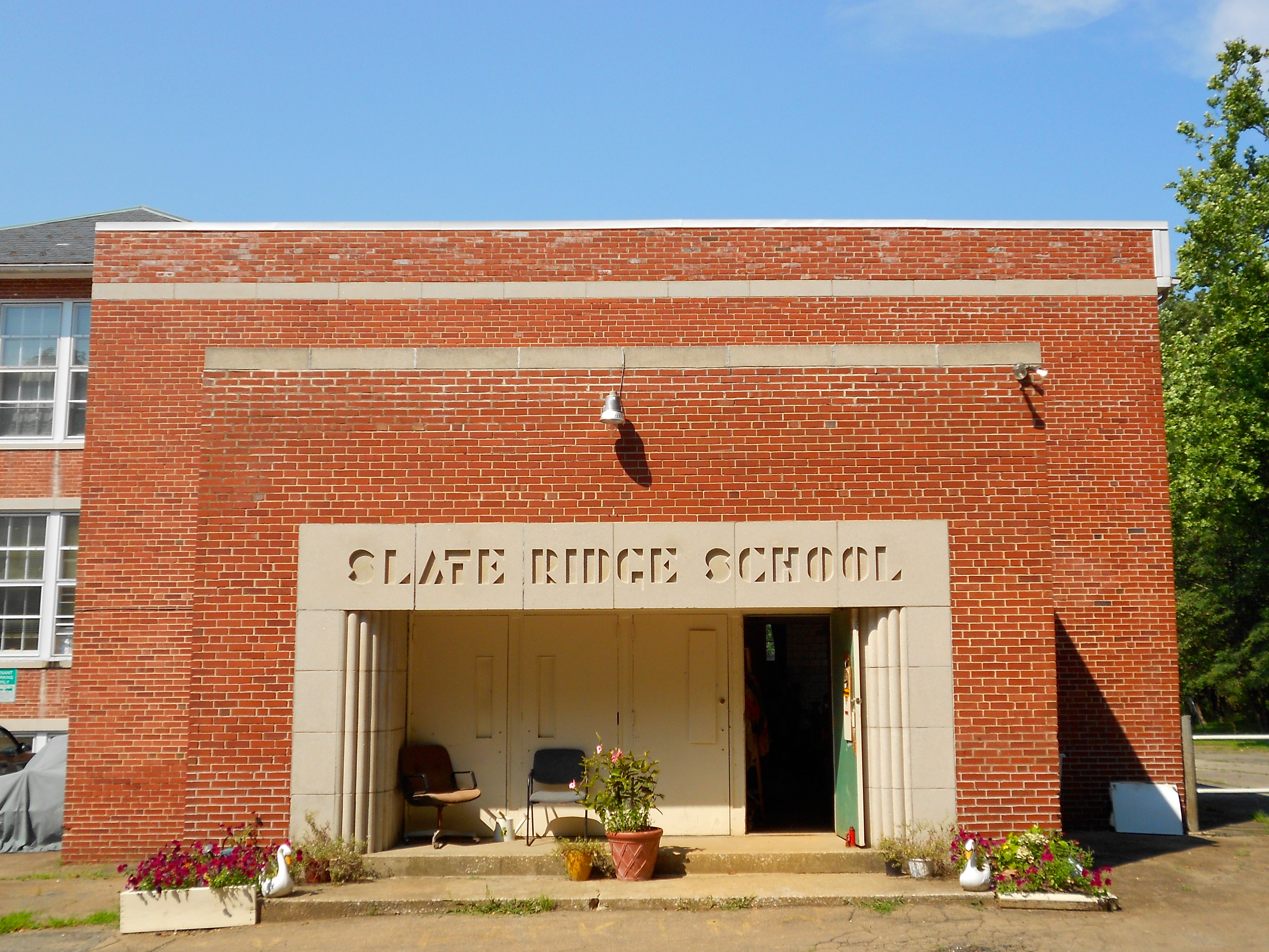
Slate Ridge School, Whiteford, Maryland

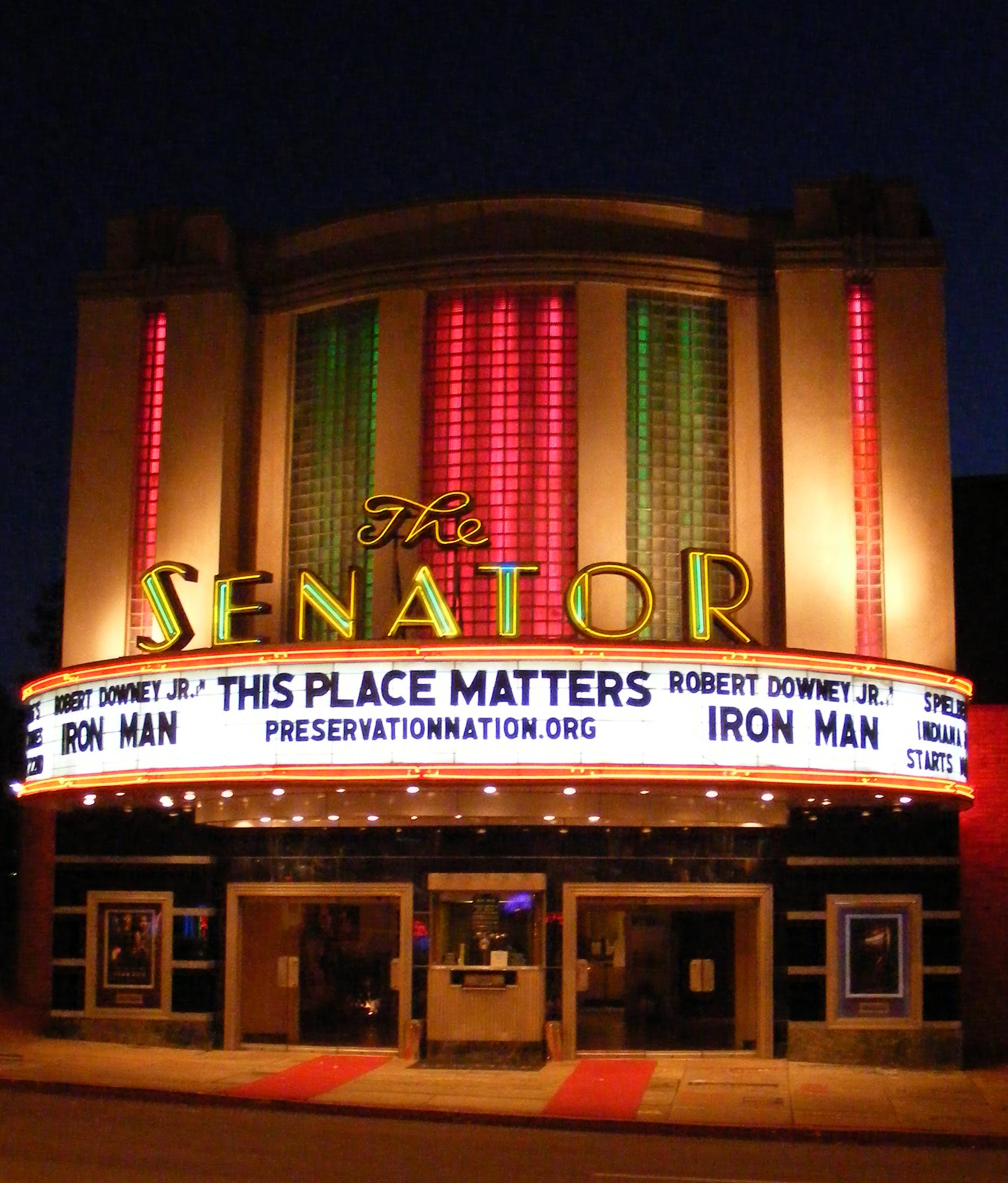
Senator Theater, Baltimore, Maryland

Building	Historic District	Location	Date	Reference
ADI Silver		Silver Spring	1938	
Associated Jewish Federation of Baltimore		Baltimore	1920s	
Avalon Theatre		Easton	1921	
Bank of America Building		Baltimore	1929	
Bethesda Theater		Bethesda	1938	
Cathedral of Mary Our Queen		Baltimore	1959	
Centre Theatre		Baltimore	1939	
Chanticleer Cocktail Lounge (now Club Hippo)		Baltimore	1939	
Churchill Theatre–Community Building		Church Hill	1929	
Coca-Cola Baltimore Branch Factory		Baltimore	1921, 1948	
Coca-Cola Bottling Company of Baltimore Building		Baltimore	1939	
David Taylor Model Basin		Bethesda	1938	
Embassy Theatre		Cumberland	1931	
Everyman Theatre (former Empire Theatre, Town Theatre)		Baltimore	1911, 1946	
Farmer's Bank and Trust Company Building		Rockville	1931	
Fillmore Silver Spring (former JC Penney's)		Silver Spring	1948	
Flower Theatre		Frederick	1950	
Fort Lincoln Funeral Home, Fort Lincoln Cemetery		Brentwood	1948	
Greenbelt Armory		Greenbelt	1954	
Greenbelt Community Center (former Greenbelt Center School)	Greenbelt Historic District	Greenbelt	1937	
Greenbelt Middle School	Greenbelt Historic District	Greenbelt	1945	
Greenbelt Museum		Greenbelt	1936	
Hecht's Department Store (now a Forever 21)		Silver Spring	1947	
House of Tomorrow		Baltimore	1937	
Magruder's Flatiron Building		Hyattsville		
Mar-Va Theater		Pocomoke City	1927	
Mihran Mesrobian House		Chevy Chase	1941, 1945	
Montgomery Arms		Silver Spring	1941	
Montgomery Ward Warehouse and Retail Store		Baltimore	1925	
Norwood School		Bethesda	1952	
Our Lady Star of the Sea Catholic Church		Solomons	1927	
Prince George's Apartments		Hyattsville	1939	
Roosevelt Center	Greenbelt Historic District	Greenbelt	1937	
Samester Parkway Apartments		Baltimore	1939	
Senator Theatre		Baltimore	1939	
Sligo Seventh-Day Adventist Church, Washington Adventist University		Takoma Park	1944	
Spring Creek Shopping Center		Silver Spring	1938	
Tastee Diner		Silver Spring	1935	
Tastee Diner		Bethesda	1939	
Tastee Diner		Laurel	1951	
Walter Reed National Military Medical Center		Bethesda	1940	
Waldorf Theatre		Waldorf	1941	
William and Catherine Biggs Farm		Detour		
WTOP-FM Transmitter		Wheaton	1941	

== Massachusetts ==
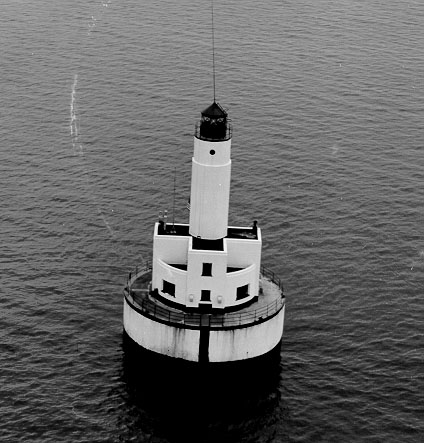
Cleveland East Ledge Light, Falmouth, Massachusetts

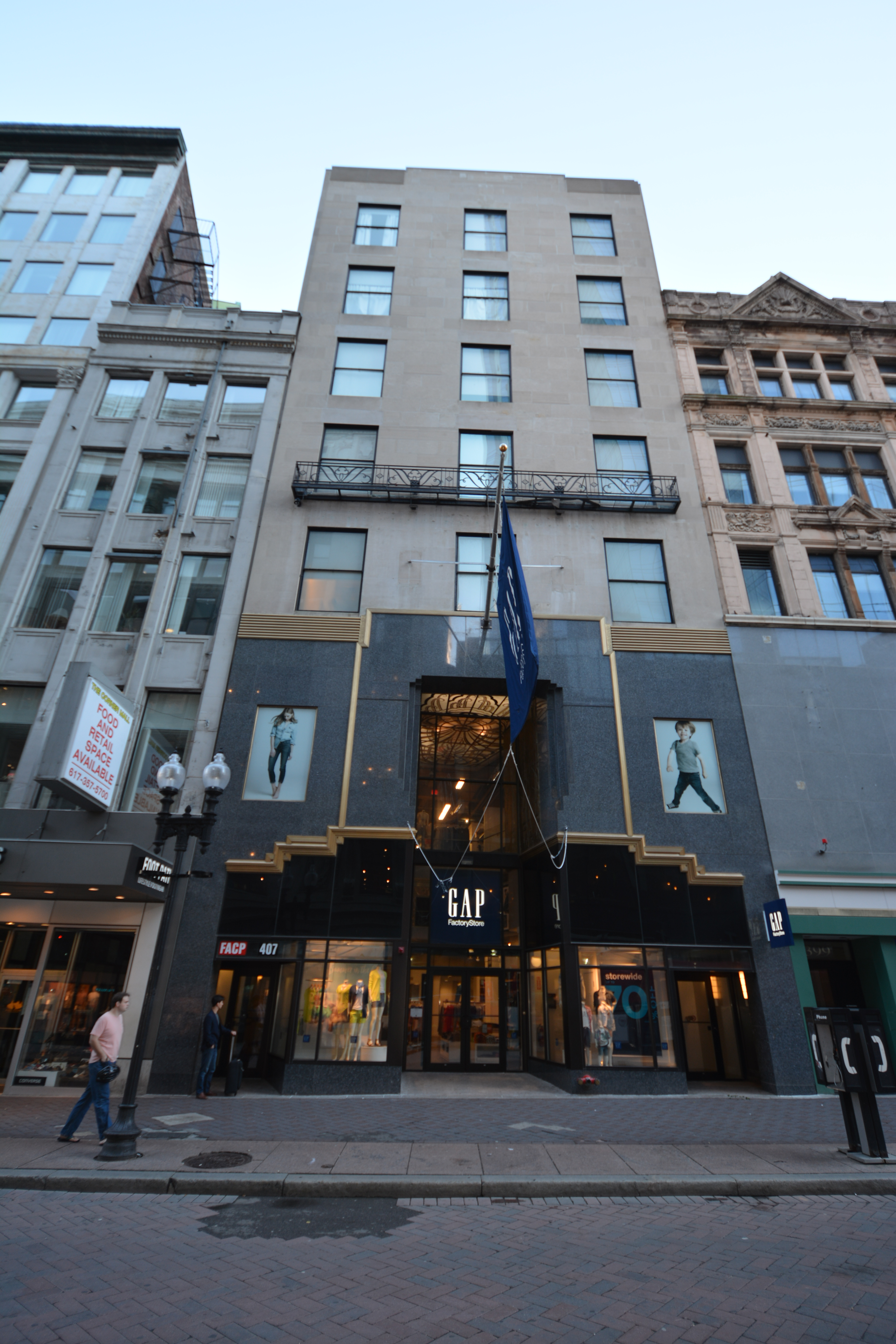
I. J. Fox Building, Boston, Massachusetts

Building	Historic District	Location	Date	Reference
Ace Art Company		Reading	1924	
B B Chemical Company		Cambridge	1937	
Berkeley Building		Boston	1947	
Boston Arts Academy (former Fenway High School)		Boston		
Boston Automatic Fire Alarm Company (now Supreme Council of the Royal Arcanum)		Boston	1936	
Calvin Coolidge Bridge		Northampton to Hadley	1936	
Cape Cinema interiors		Dennis	1930	
Cape Cod Canal Railroad Bridge		Bourne	1933–35	
Cleveland East Ledge Light		Falmouth	1940–1943	
Coolidge Corner Theatre		Brookline	1933	
East Cambridge Savings Bank		Cambridge	1931	
Eastern Middlesex County Second District Court		Waltham	1938	
F. W. Woolworth Building	Moody Street Historic District	Waltham	1949	
Fall River Cooperative Bank		Fall River	1929	
Faneuil Branch Boston Public Library, Brighton		Boston	1931	
Granite Trust Company		Quincy	1929	
Haven Cinema		Boston	1937	
Homer's Jewelry		Boston	1928	
Hudson Building		Boston	1928	
I. J. Fox Building		Boston	1934	
John W. McCormack Post Office and Courthouse		Boston	1933	
Landmark Center		Boston	1928	
Lesley University Bookstore (former Sears, Roebuck and Co.)		Cambridge	1928	
Liberty Mutual Insurance Company (former John Hancock Mutual Life Insurance Company), Back Bay		Boston	1922	
Lynn Memorial City Hall and Auditorium		Lynn	1949	
Malden High School Donald E. Brunelli Jr. Building		Malden	1935	
Mary E. Curley School, Jamaica Plain		Boston	1931	
Mary Jeanette Murray Bath House	Hull Shore Drive and Nantasket Avenue	Nantasket	1930	
Massachusetts School of Art		Boston	1930	
Mohawk Theatre		North Adams	1938	
New England Telephone & Telegraph Building, Post Office Square		Boston	1947	
Old Athol High School		Athol	1937	
Pierce Arrow Showroom, 1065–1075 Commonwealth Avenue		Boston	1929	
Paramount Theatre		Boston	1932	
Pearl Street School		Reading	1939	
Public Service Building (now Wyndham Boston)		Boston	1928	
Regal Cinema		Boston	1937	
Scrafft's Center, Sullivan Square, Charlestown		Boston	1928	
Second National Bank, 75 Federal Street		Boston	1929	
Shepards Department Store		Boston	1936	
Shreve, Crump & Low, 330 Boylston Street		Boston	1929	
Springfield Safe Deposit and Trust Company		Springfield	1933	
St. Thomas More Oratory		Boston	1935	
Suffolk County Courthouse addition,		Boston	1937	
Thomas P. Costin Jr. Post Office Building		Lynn	1933	
United Shoe Machinery Corporation Building		Boston	1929	
United States Post Office Garage		Boston	1941	
United States Post Office–Holyoke Main		Holyoke	1935	
Verizon Building (former New England Telephone Building)		Lynn	1931	
Verizon Building		Worcester	1929	
Victory Theater		Holyoke	1920	
West End Market		North Adams	1930s	
Western Union Building (now Hamilton Building)		Boston	1930	
White Drum Tea Room		Orange	1935	
Winchester Cooperative Bank		Winchester	1931	

== Mississippi ==
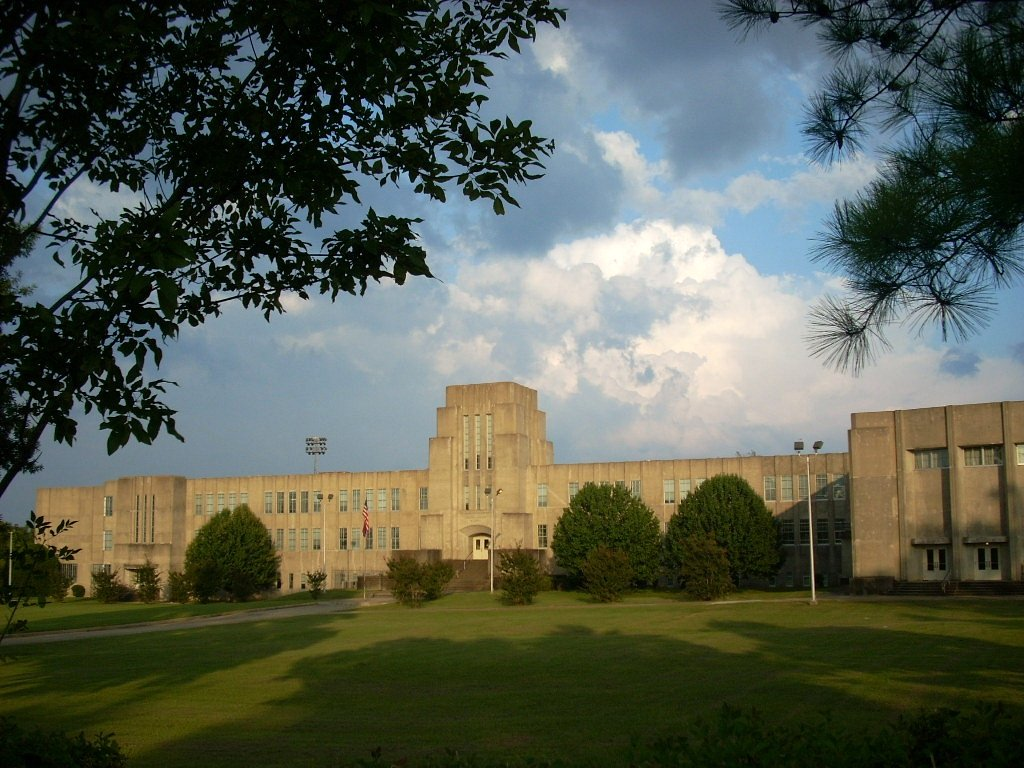
Bailey Magnet High School, Jackson, Mississippi

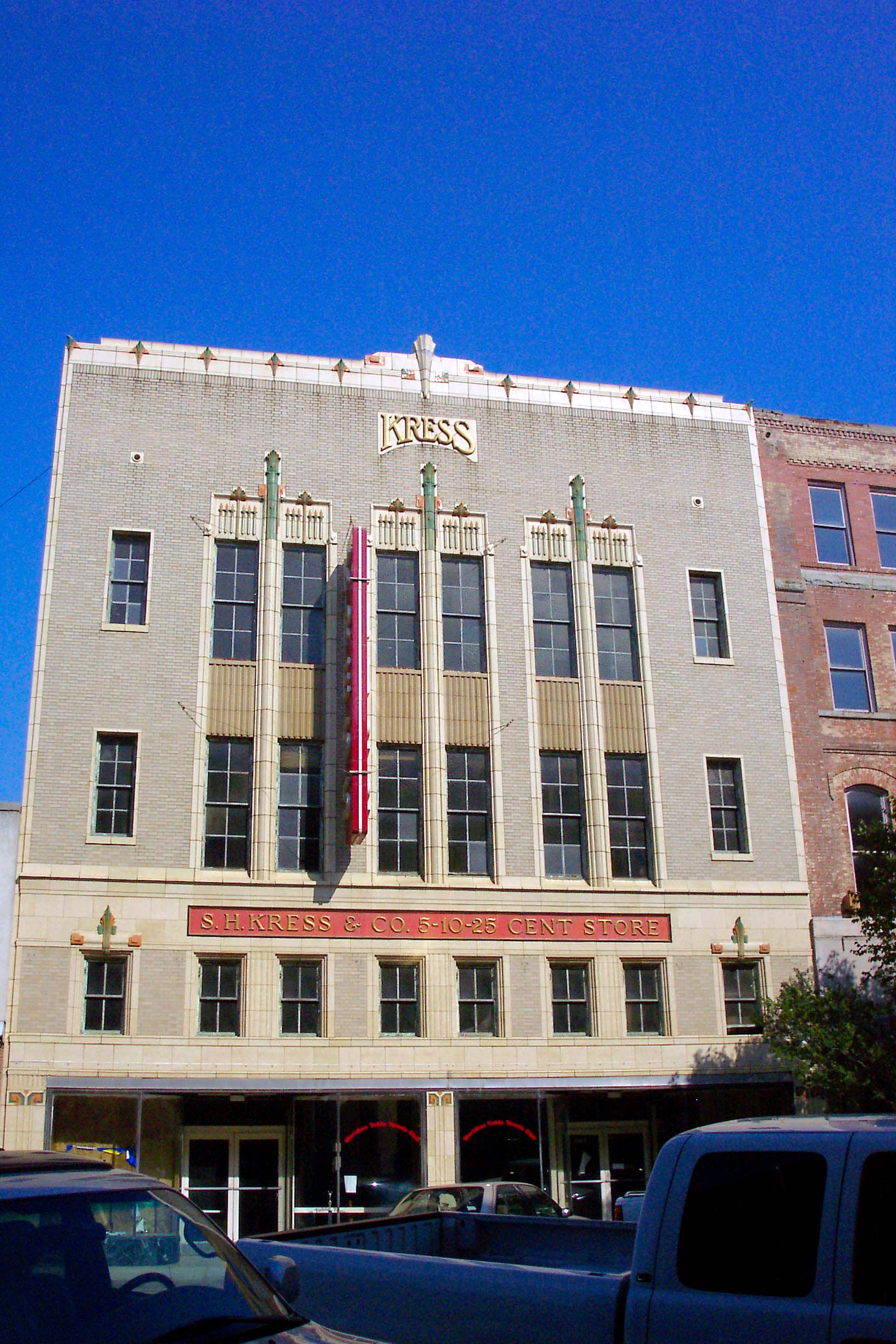
S. H. Kress and Co. Building, Meridian, Mississippi

Building	Historic District	Location	Date	Reference
Agee's Automotive Repair & Towne Parking		Lincoln	1920s	
Alamo Theatre		Jackson	1949	
Amory National Guard Armory		Amory	1938	
Bailey Magnet High School		Jackson	1938	
Canton High School		Canton	1923, 1938	
Clarksdale Civic Auditorium		Clarksdale	1939	
Columbia High School		Columbia	1937	
Elkin Theater		Aberdeen	1937	
George Elementary School		Jackson	1929	
Haven Theater		Brookhaven	1935	
Hercules Powder Company		Hattiesburg	1923	
Hinds County Courthouse		Jackson	1930	
Hostess Cake Building		Greenville		
Madison–Ridgeland Public School		Madison	1922, 1936	
Mary Buie Museum, University of Mississippi		Oxford	1939	
Mississippi State University Bulldog Store (former S. H. Kress and Co. Building)		Meridian	1934	
Moss Point High School		Moss Point	1941	
Naval Reserve Center		Jackson	1949	
Saenger Theater		Hattiesburg	1929	
Senatobia High School		Senatobia		
Smith Robertson Elementary School		Jackson	1909, 1929	
Standard Life Building		Jackson	1929	
Taylor Building		Biloxi		
Threefoot Building		Meridian	1929	
Trace Theater		Port Gibson	1945	
Tupelo Church Street School		Tupelo	1938	
United States Post Office		Hattiesburg	1934	
United States Post Office		New Albany		
United States Post Office and Courthouse		Meridian	1933	
Union County Jail		New Albany		
War Memorial Building		Jackson	1939	
Warren County Courthouse		Vicksburg, Mississippi	1940	
Wayne County Courthouse		Waynesboro	1936	
Wollfolk State Office Building		Jackson	1949	

== Montana ==
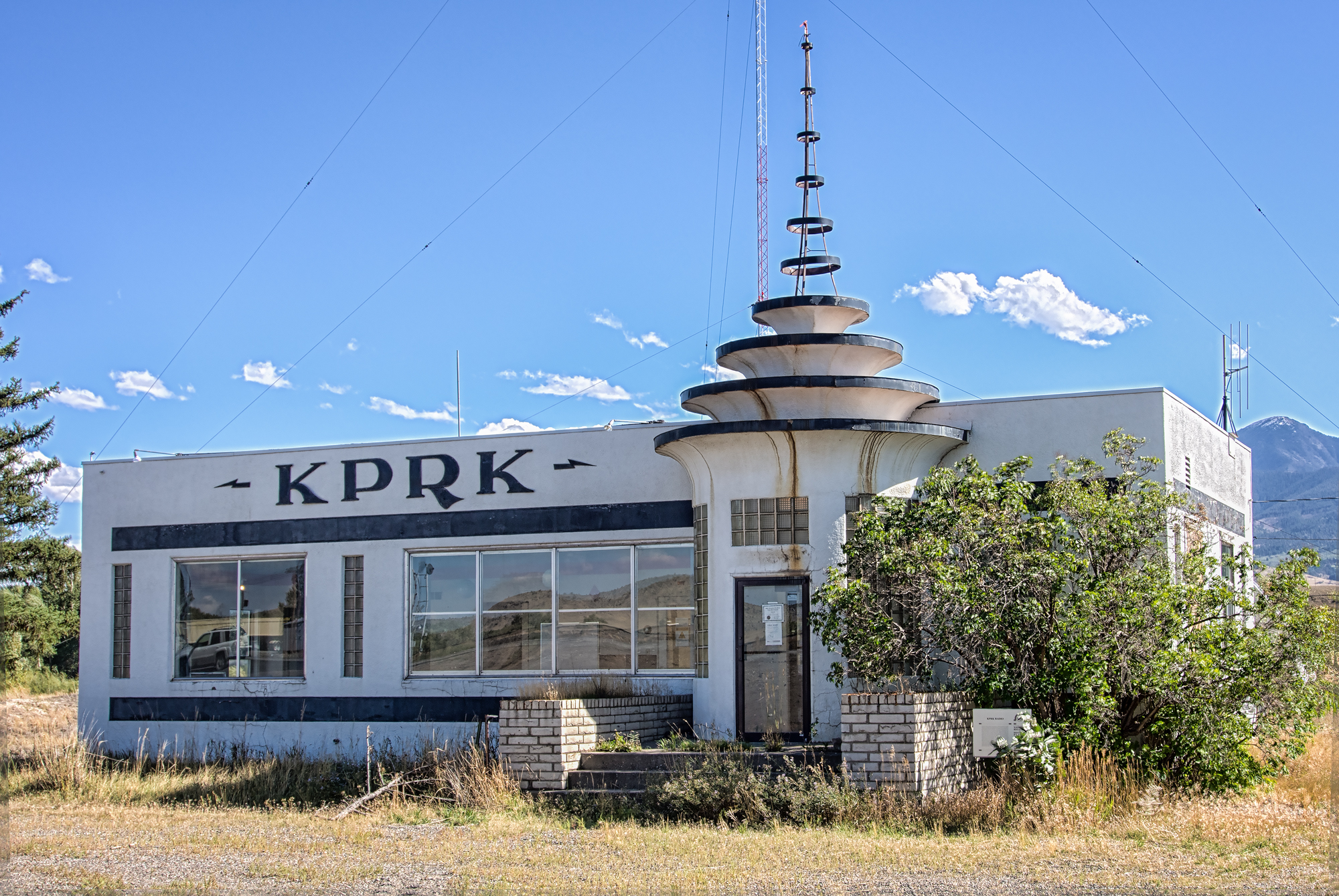
KPRK Radio Building, Livingston, Montana

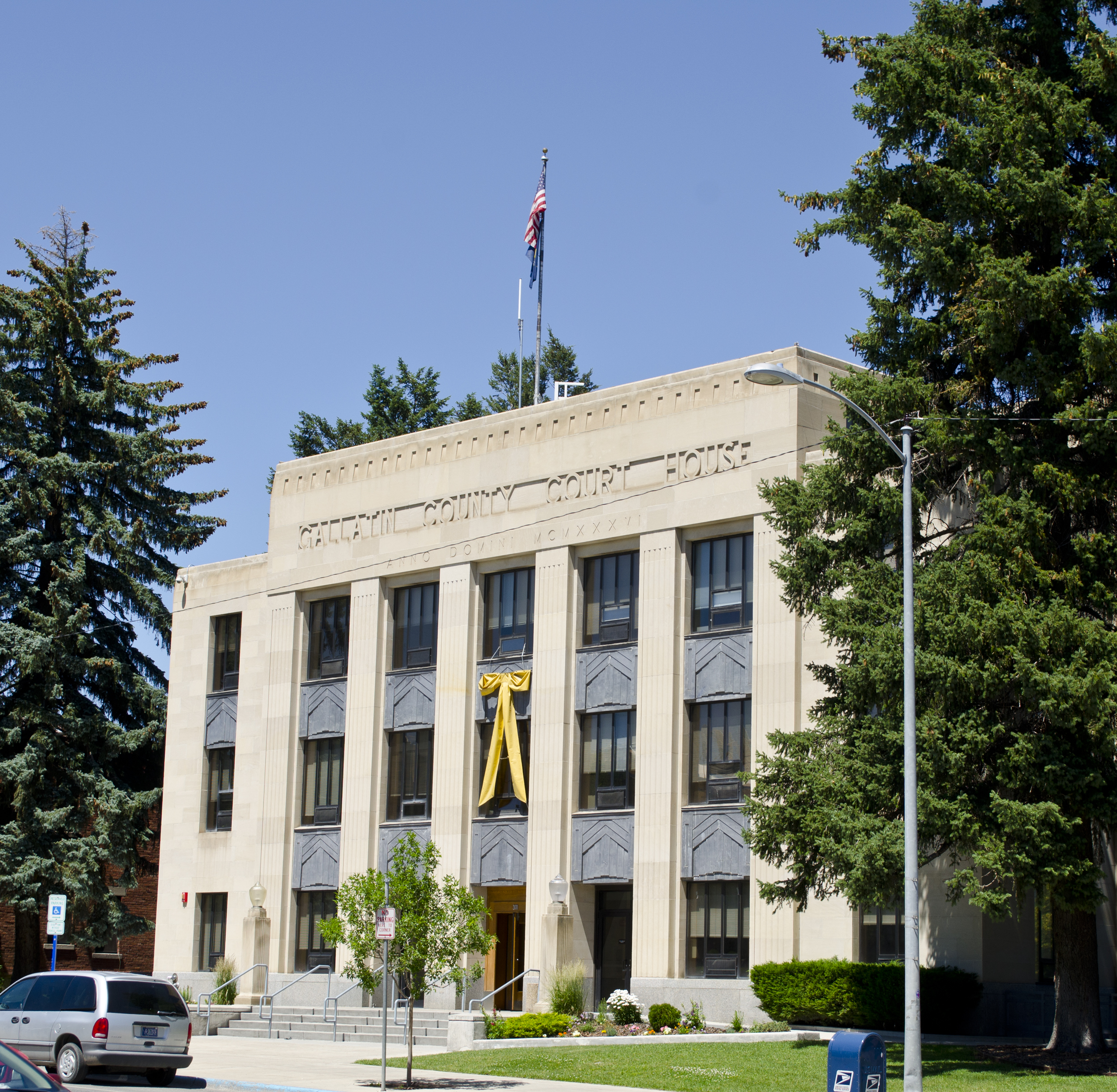
Gallatin County Courthouse, Bozeman, Montana

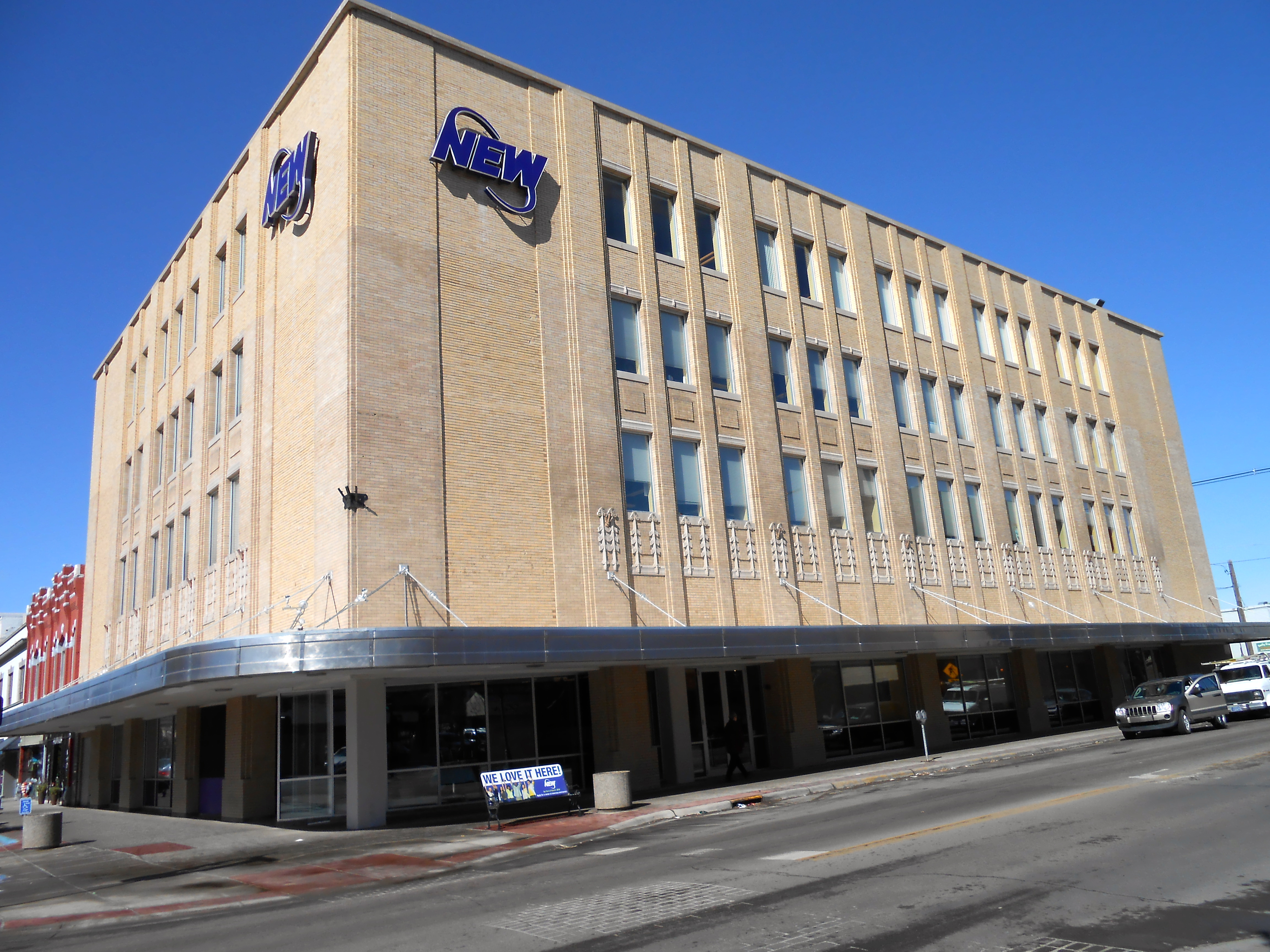
Paris Dry Good Store, Great Falls, Montana

Building	Historic District	Location	Date	Reference
Alberta Bair Theater		Billings	1931	
Anderson's Style Shop		Kalispell	1941	
Babcock Theater		Billings	1907	
Beacon Tire and Garage		Polson		
Bennett Automobile Dealership		Great Falls	1948	
Bozeman Sheet Metal Works		Bozeman	1936	
Bridger Arms Apartments		Bozeman	1926	
Butte High School		Butte	1930s	
Centre Theatre		Sidney	1947	
Civic Center		Great Falls	1939	
Cloyd Funeral Home		Lewistown	1950	
Club Moderne		Anaconda	1937	
Conrad City Hall		Conrad	1916	
Dome Theater		Libby	1948	
Dubbs Block (former Great Falls Motor Co.)		Great Falls	1949	
Ellen Theater		Bozeman		
Emmanuel Conception Church		Butte	1941	
Empire Twin Theater		Livingston	1935	
Florence Hotel		Missoula	1941	
Gallatin County Courthouse		Bozeman	1935	
Gallatin County High School		Bozeman	1936	
Garage Soup Shack & Mesquite Grill (former Litening Gas)		Bozeman	1939	
Glacier Cinemas (former State Theatre)		Cut Bank	1939	
Graf Building		Bozeman	1941	
Hamill Apartments		Bozeman	1931	
Hammond Arcade		Missoula	1934	
Hathhorn Building		Bozeman	1942	
Hi-Line Theatre		Rudyard	1949	
Hotel Baxter		Bozeman	1929	
Intermountain Bus Depot		Great Falls	1947	
Kimpton Armory Hotel (former Bozeman Armory)		Bozeman	1941	
KCFW Radio Building (former City Service Station)		Kalispell	1931	
KPRK Radio Building		Livingston	1946	
Lake County Courthouse		Polson	1935	
Lone Peak Cinema		Big Sky	1911	
Montana ExpoPark Administration Building		Great Falls	1937	
Montana ExpoPark Fine Arts Building		Great Falls	1937	
Montana ExpoPark Mercantile Building		Great Falls	1937	
Montana State Arsenal, Armory, and Drill Hall		Helena	1942	
Montana Theatre		Miles City	1936	
Old Cooney Home	Lewis and Clark County Hospital Historic District	Helena	1891, 1939	
Oliver Building		Billings	1910, 1930	
Orpheum Theatre		Conrad	1918	
Orpheum Theatre		Plentywood		
Paris Dry Goods Store		Great Falls	1929	
Professional Building Law Offices (former Fred Siber's Pharmacy)		Bozeman	1926	
Pub Station (former Greyhound Bus Station)		Billings	1946	
Rainbow Senior Living Center (former Rainbow Hotel)		Great Falls	1909, 1930s	
ReMax of Great Falls (former Joe McNaught Service Station)		Great Falls	1940	
Rex Theatre		Thompson Falls		
Rialto Theater		Bozeman	1922	
Rio Theatre (now Vigilante Theatre)		Helena	1947	
Roman Theatre		Red Lodge	1917, 1935	
Roxy Theatre		Choteau	1946	
Roxy Theatre		Forsyth	1930	
Roxy Theater		Missoula	1937	
S. H. Kress and Co. Building		Billings	1925	
S. H. Kress and Co. Building		Great Falls	1931	
St. Xavier Public School		Billings		
Strand Theater		Kalispell	1927	
US Bank Branch, West 6th Avenue		Helena		
Washoe Theater		Anaconda	1931	
Wilma Theater		Missoula	1921	

== Nebraska ==
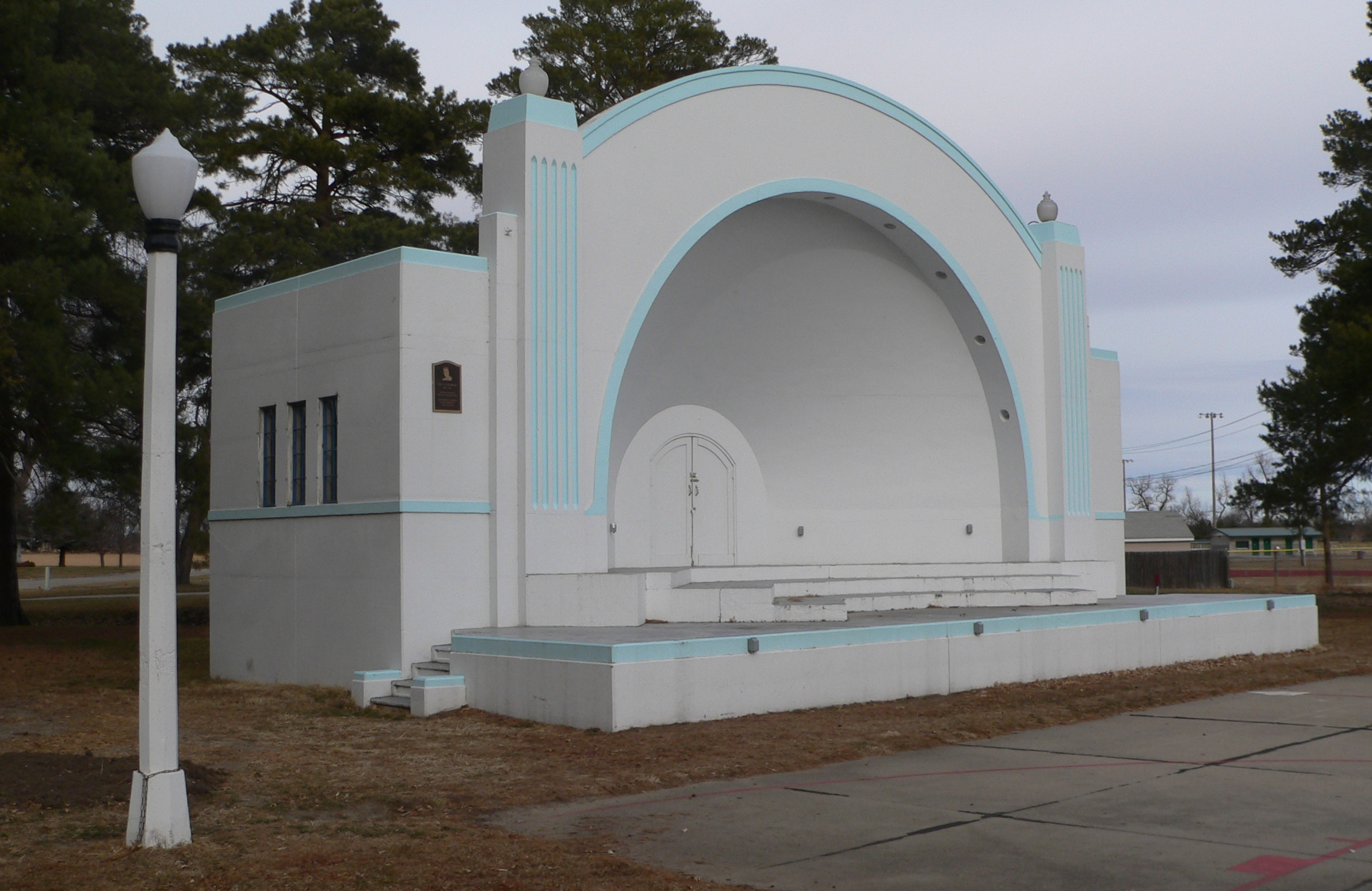
Athletic Park Band Shell, Plainview, Nebraska

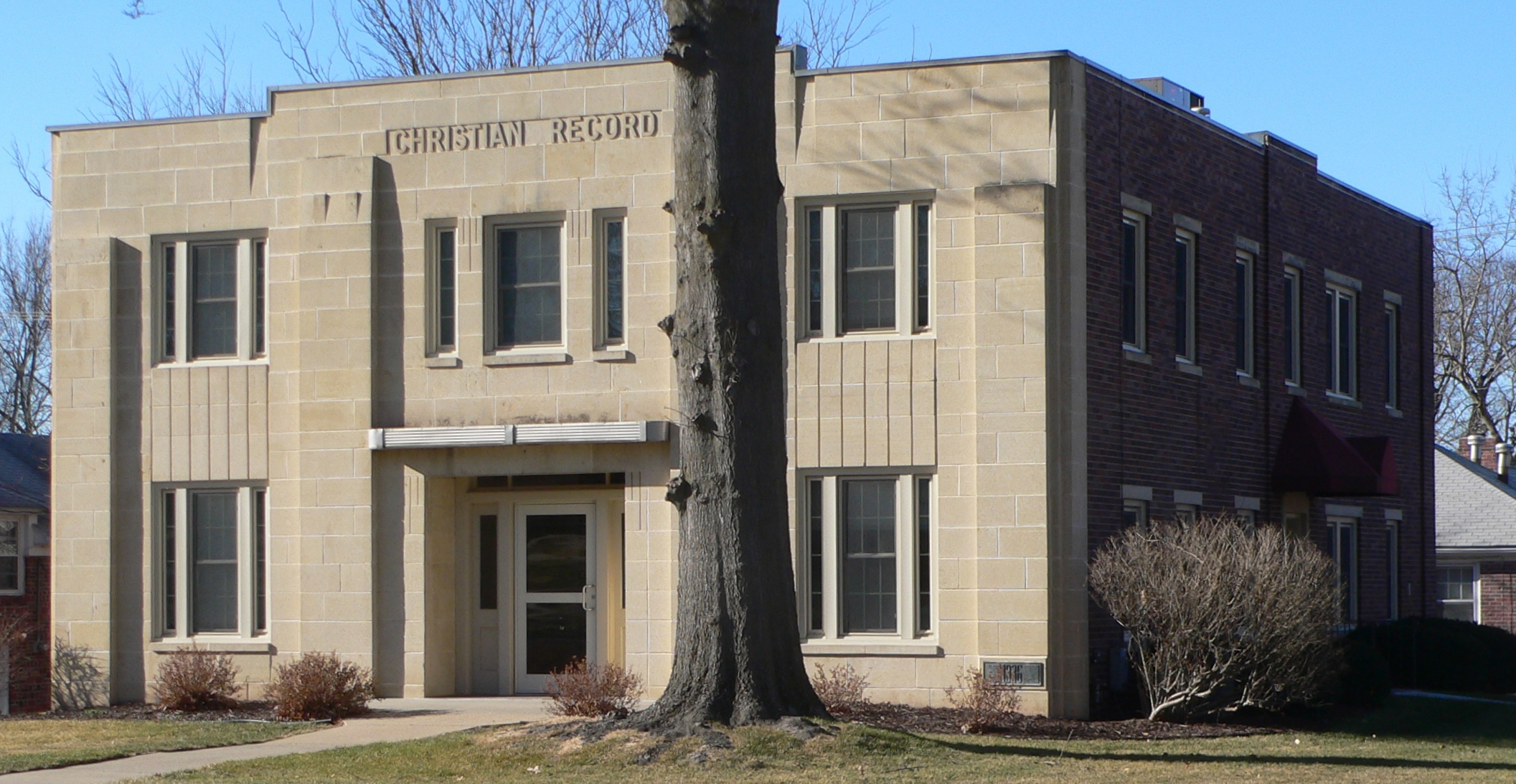
Christian Record Building, Lincoln, Nebraska

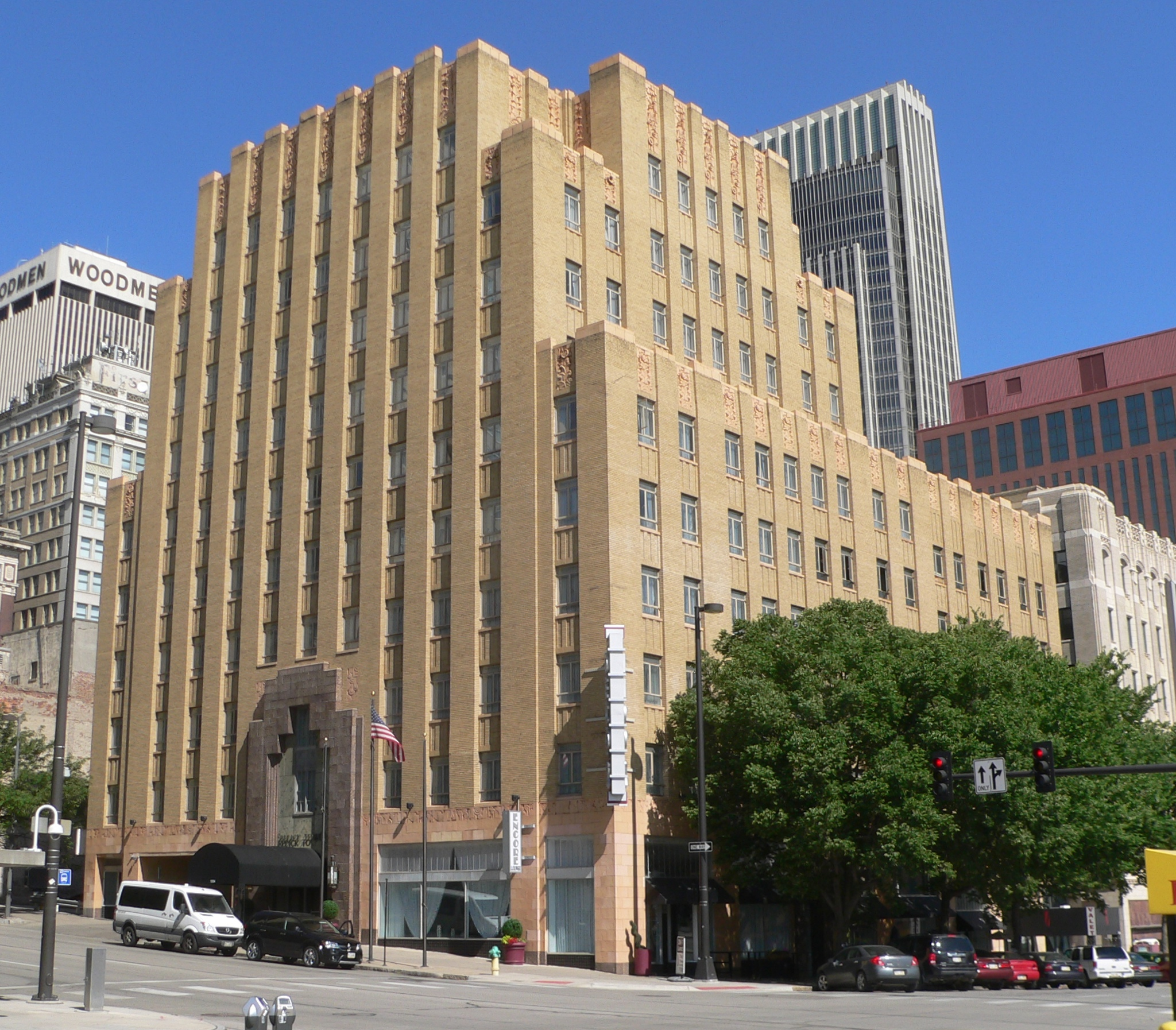
Redick Tower, Omaha, Nebraska

Building	Historic District	Location	Date	Reference
40th Street Theatre		Omaha	1930, 1944	
Alliance Theatre (Imperial-Fox Imperial Theatre)	Alliance Commercial Historic District	Alliance	1937	
Athletic Park Band Shell		Plainview	1942	
Auditorium		Dodge		
Auditorium		North Bend		
Auditorium		Oakland		
Auditorium		Superior		
Auditorium		York	1940	
Bassett Lodge and Range Cafe		Bassett	1949	
Beatrice Municipal Auditorium		Beatrice	1940	
Benalto Theater (now Benson Theatre)		Omaha	1923	
Bourbon Theatre		Lincoln	1931	
Christian Record Building		Lincoln	1936	
City Hall		Holdrege	1939	
City Hall		Kearney		
City Hall (former Public Power Building)		Columbus		
Columbus Theater		Columbus	1938	
Creighton Hall		Omaha		
Crites Hall		Chadron	1938	
Dakota County Courthouse		Dakota City	1941	
David City Park and Municipal Auditorium		David City	1889, 1941	
Dawes County Courthouse		Chadron	1935	
Dixon County Courthouse		Ponca	1940	
Edna Work Hall		Chadron	1932	
Farm Bureau Financial Services (former Hotel Leslie)		Superior		
Federal Office Building		Omaha	1934	
Fire Station 5		Omaha		
Fort Theater		Kearney	1914, 1940	
Fraternal Order of Eagles		Fremont	1930s	
Fremont Municipal Auditorium		Fremont	1937	
Gold and Company Store Building		Lincoln	1924	
Golden Husk Theater		Ord	1928	
Gosper County Courthouse		Elwood	1939	
Grand Theatre		Grand Island	1937	
Grant City Park Band Shel		Grant	1935	
H. J. Bartenbach House		Grand Island	1937	
Hastings Municipal Airport Hangar–Building No. 1		Hastings	1930	
Hebron United States Post Office		Hebron	1937	
Hinky-Dinky Supermarket (now Charlie Graham Body and Service)		Omaha	1942	
Holt County Courthouse		O'Neill	1936	
House of Tomorrow,		Omaha	1933	
Ideal Cleaners		Falls City		
Isis Theatre		Crete	1926	
Joslyn Art Museum		Omaha	1931	
Joyo Theatre		Lincoln	1926	
Karl Stefan Memorial Airport Administration Building		Norfolk	1946	
Kearney National Guard Armory		Kearney	1936	
Lincoln Liberty Life Insurance Building		Lincoln	1907, 1936	
Memorial Field		David City		
Midwest Theater		Scottsbluff	1946	
Minden United States Post Office		Minden	1939	
Municipal Auditorium		Chester		
Municipal Auditorium		David City		
Municipal Swimming Pool		Blair	1933	
Nebraska State Capitol		Lincoln	1932	
New Moon Theater		Neligh	1947	
Oakland City Auditorium		Oakland	1940	
Ord Theater		Ord	1930	
Parks Maintenance Building		Omaha	1940s	
Paxton Hotel		Omaha	1928	
Phi Delta Theta Fraternity House		Lincoln	1937	
Pioneer Theatre		Nebraska City	1949	
Police Department (former City Hall)		Holdrege	1939	
President and Ambassador Apartments		Lincoln	1928	
Red Cloud United States Post Office		Red Cloud	1941	
Redick Tower		Omaha	1930	
Rock County Courthouse		Bassett	1939	
Sokol Auditorium		Omaha	1926	
St. Stanislaus Catholic Church		Duncan	1939	
State Theatre (former New Booth Theatre)		Auburn	1930, 1934	
Stuart Building		Lincoln	1927	
Stubbs–Ballah House		Norfolk	1917	
Superior City Hall and Auditorium		Superior	1936	
T. T. Varney Building		Broken Bow	1934	
Telephone Building		McCook	1920s–1930s	
Troxel Insurance, Broken Bow, 1937		Broken Bow	1937	
Union Station (now Durham Museum)		Omaha	1931	
United States Post Office		Crawford	1939	
United States Post Office		Ogallala	1938	
United States Post Office		Schuyler	1940	
United States Post Office-Valentine		Valentine	1939	
Vestey Center		Superior		
Wayne Municipal Auditorium		Wayne	1935	
Wayne United States Post Office		Wayne	1934	
Western Public Service Building		Scottsbluff	1931	
World Theatre		Kearney	1927	

== Nevada ==
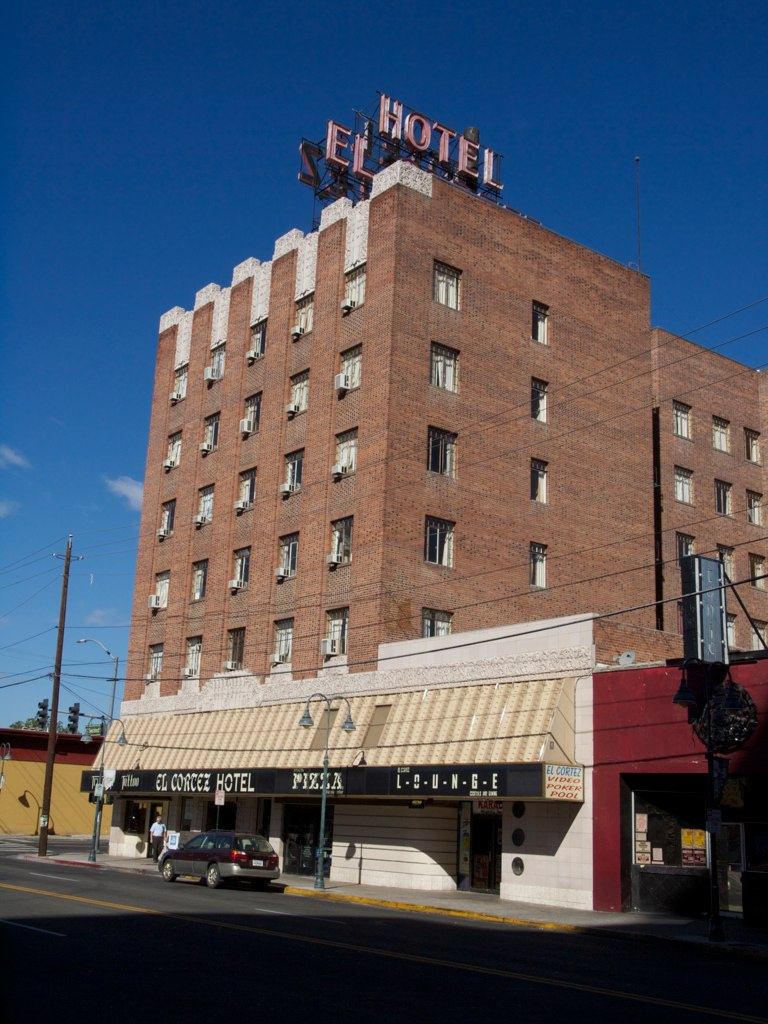
El Cortez, Reno, Nevada

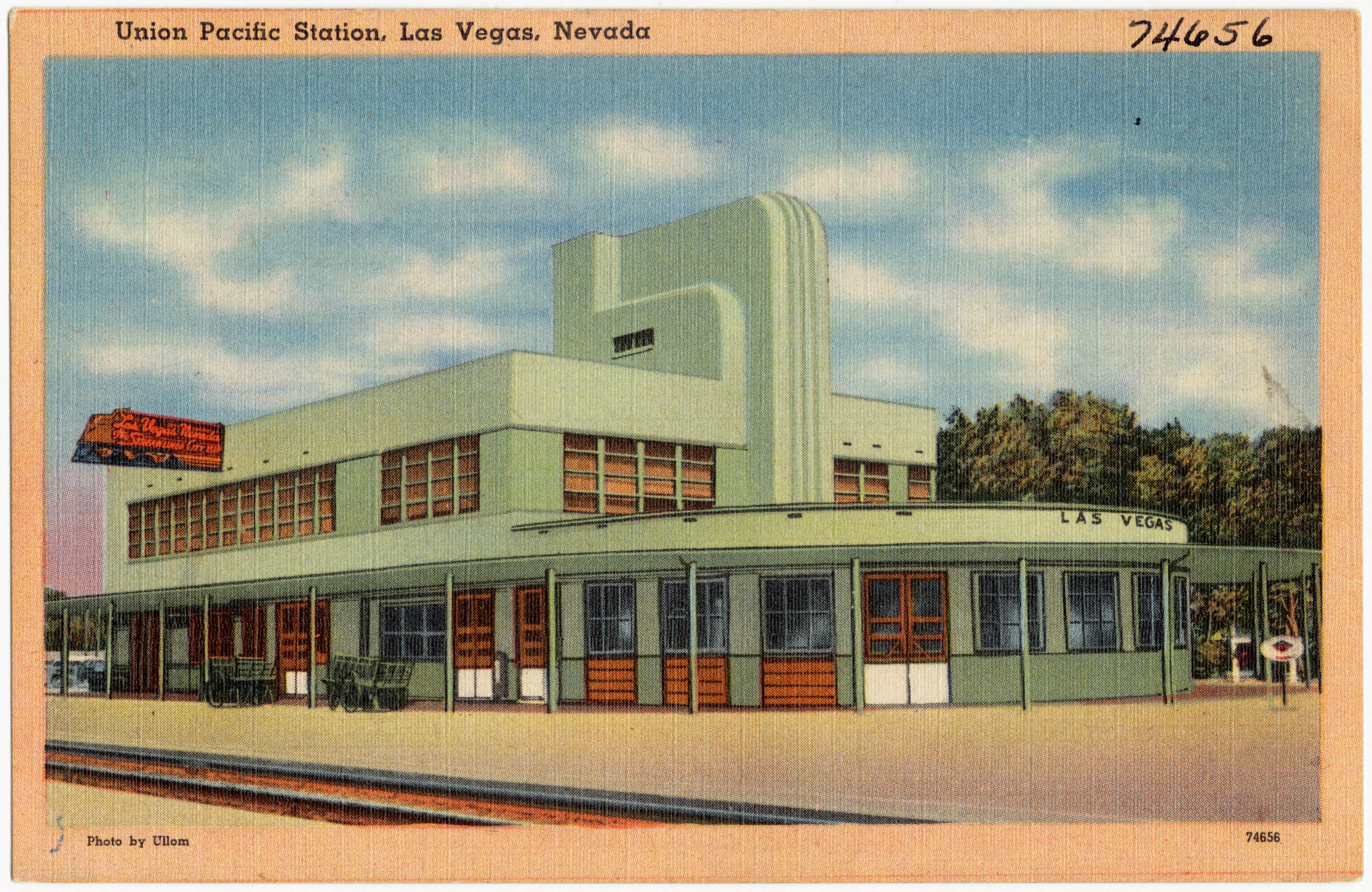
Union Pacific station (demolished), Las Vegas

Building	Historic District	Location	Date	Reference
1938 Lincoln County Courthouse		Pioche	1938	
Capital Theater		Ely	1916, 1923	
Central Theater		Ely	1941	
Clark Avenue Railroad Underpass		Las Vegas	1936	
El Cortez		Reno	1931	
Ho Hum Motel Garage		Reno		
Hoover Dam		Boulder City	1936	
Humboldt General Hospital expansion		Winnemucca	1942	
Huntridge Theater		Las Vegas	1944	
Landrum's Hamburger System No. 1		Reno	1947	
Las Vegas High School Academic Building and Gymnasium	Las Vegas High School Historic District	Las Vegas	1930	
Mapes Hotel		Reno	1947	
Mineral County High School		Hawthorne	1934	
Pershing School District Office		Lovelock	1941	
Reno Main Post Office		Reno	1933	
Rex Theatre		Caliente		
Sixth Street School		Hawthorne	1936	
Smith Center for the Performing Arts		Las Vegas	2012	
Southside School		Reno	1936	
United States Post Office		Tonopah	1941	
United States Post Office		Lovelock	1937	
University of Nevada, Reno Gymnasium		Reno	1946	
Vocational-Agricultural Building		Lovelock	1941	
Veterans of Foreign Wars Building		Reno	194	
Veterans Memorial Elementary School		Reno	1949	
Washington School		North Las Vegas	1932	
Winnemucca Volunteer Fire Department		Winnemucca	1935	

== New Hampshire ==
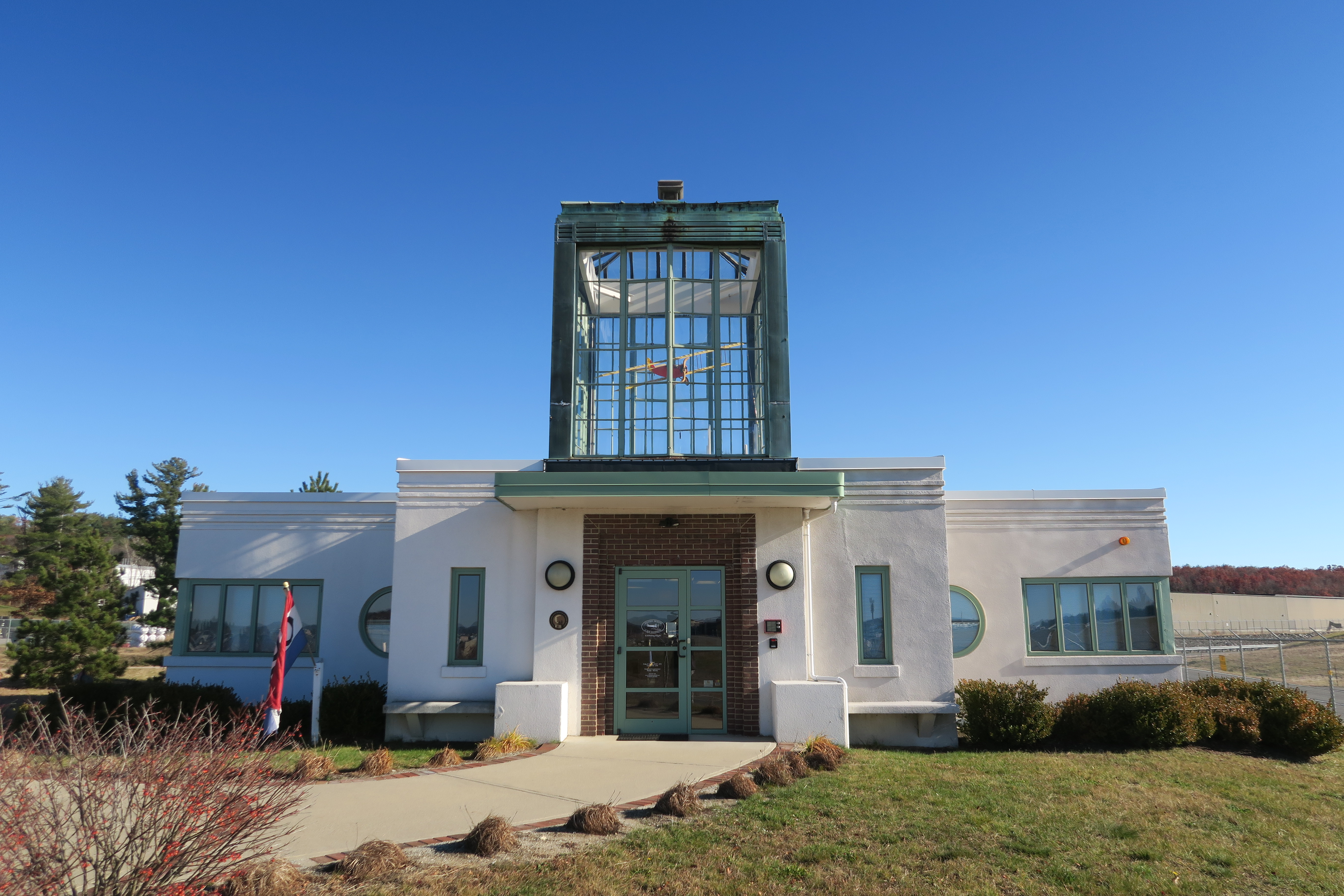
Aviation Museum of New Hampshire, Londonderry, New Hampshire

Building	Historic District	Location	Date	Reference
Aviation Museum of New Hampshire		Londonderry	1937	
Bolduc Block		Conway	1923	
Bowling Alley		Berlin		
Colonial Theatre		Bethlehem	1915	
Concord Public Library		Concord	1940	
Lebanon College (former F. W. Woolworth's Store)		Lebanon		
Sewer Treatment Plant and Pumping Station		Hampton Beach	1935	
United States Post Office-Lancaster Main		Lancaster	1935	

== New Mexico ==
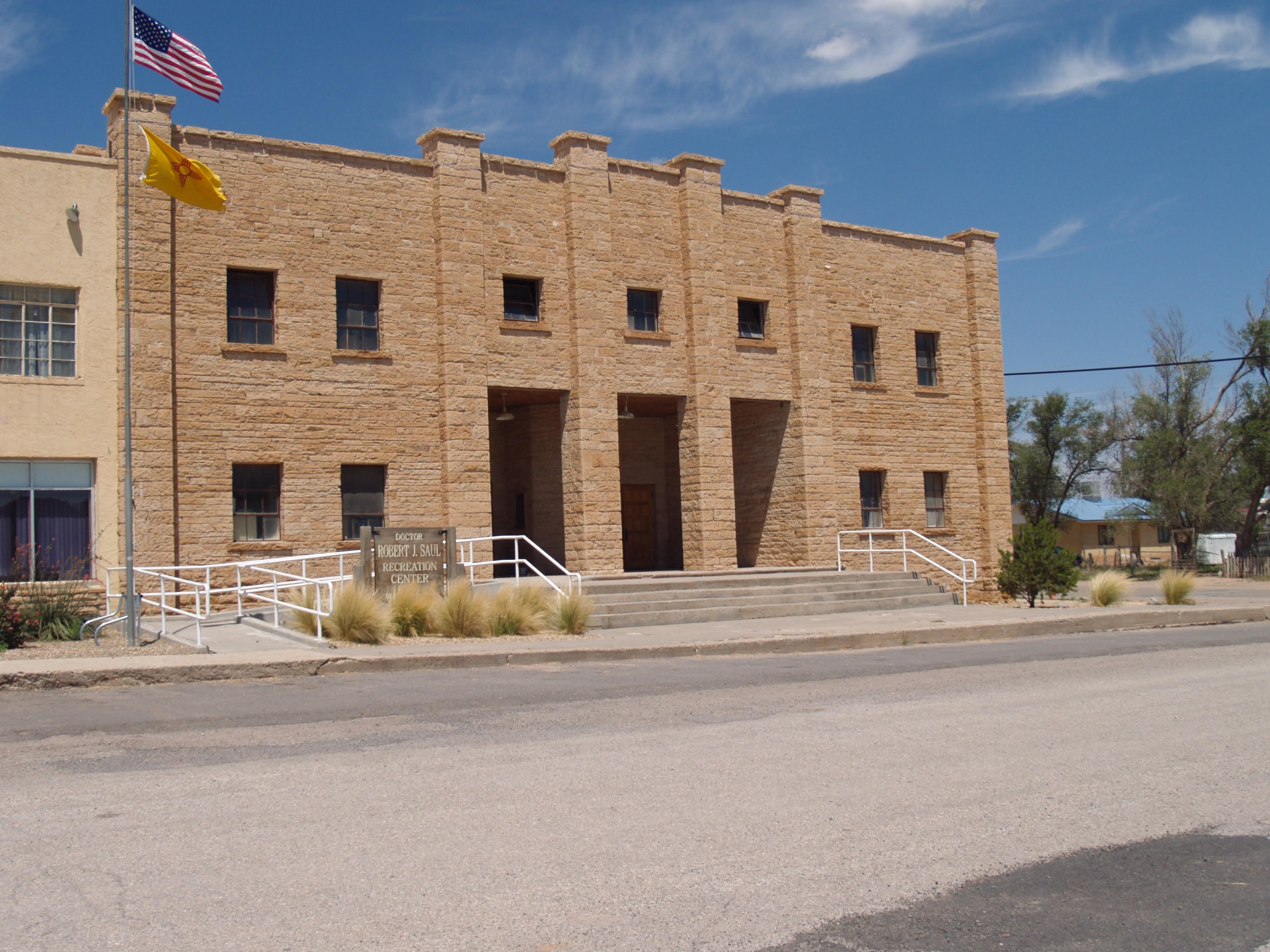
Mountainair Municipal Auditorium, Mountainair, New Mexico

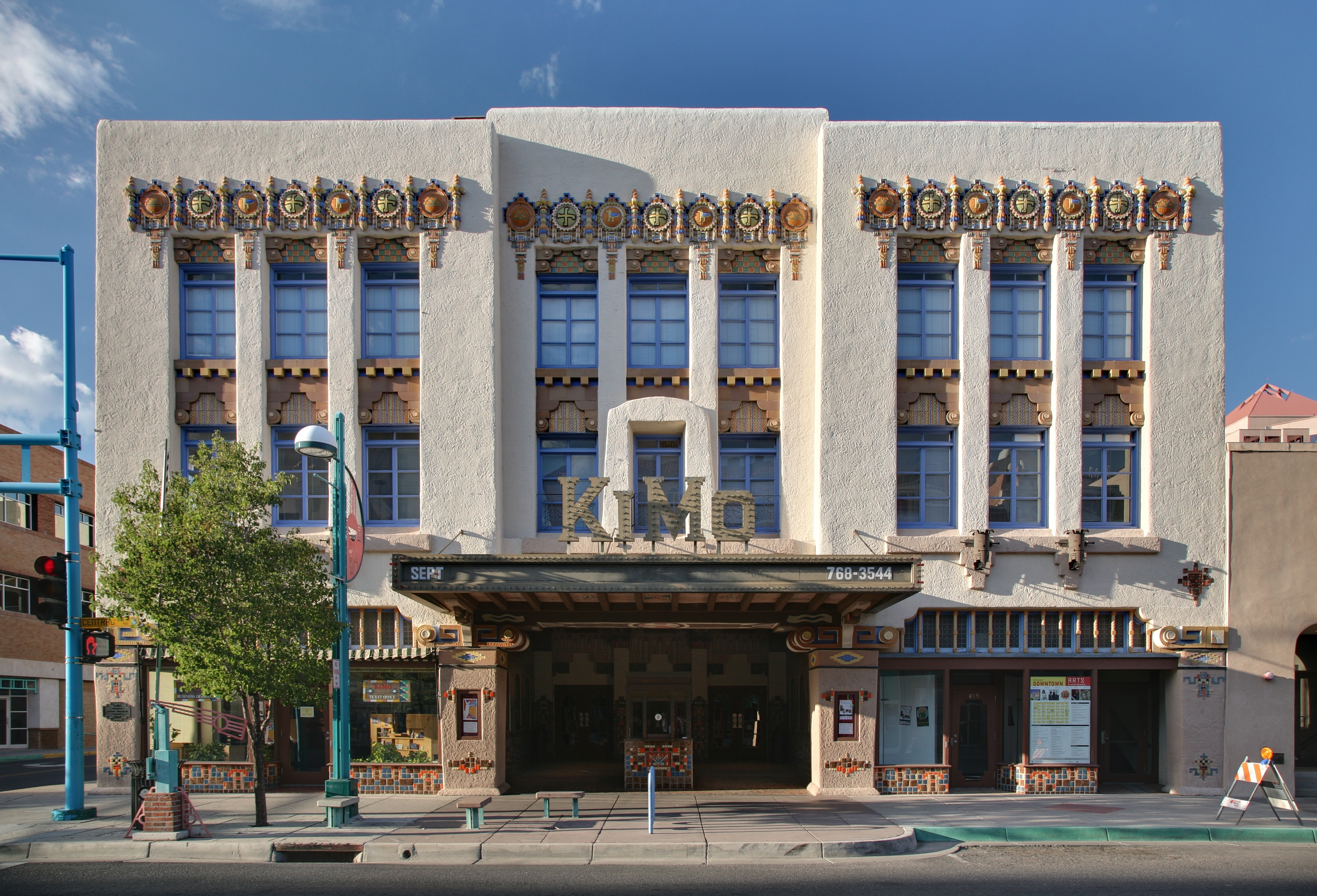
KiMo Theater, Albuquerque, New Mexico

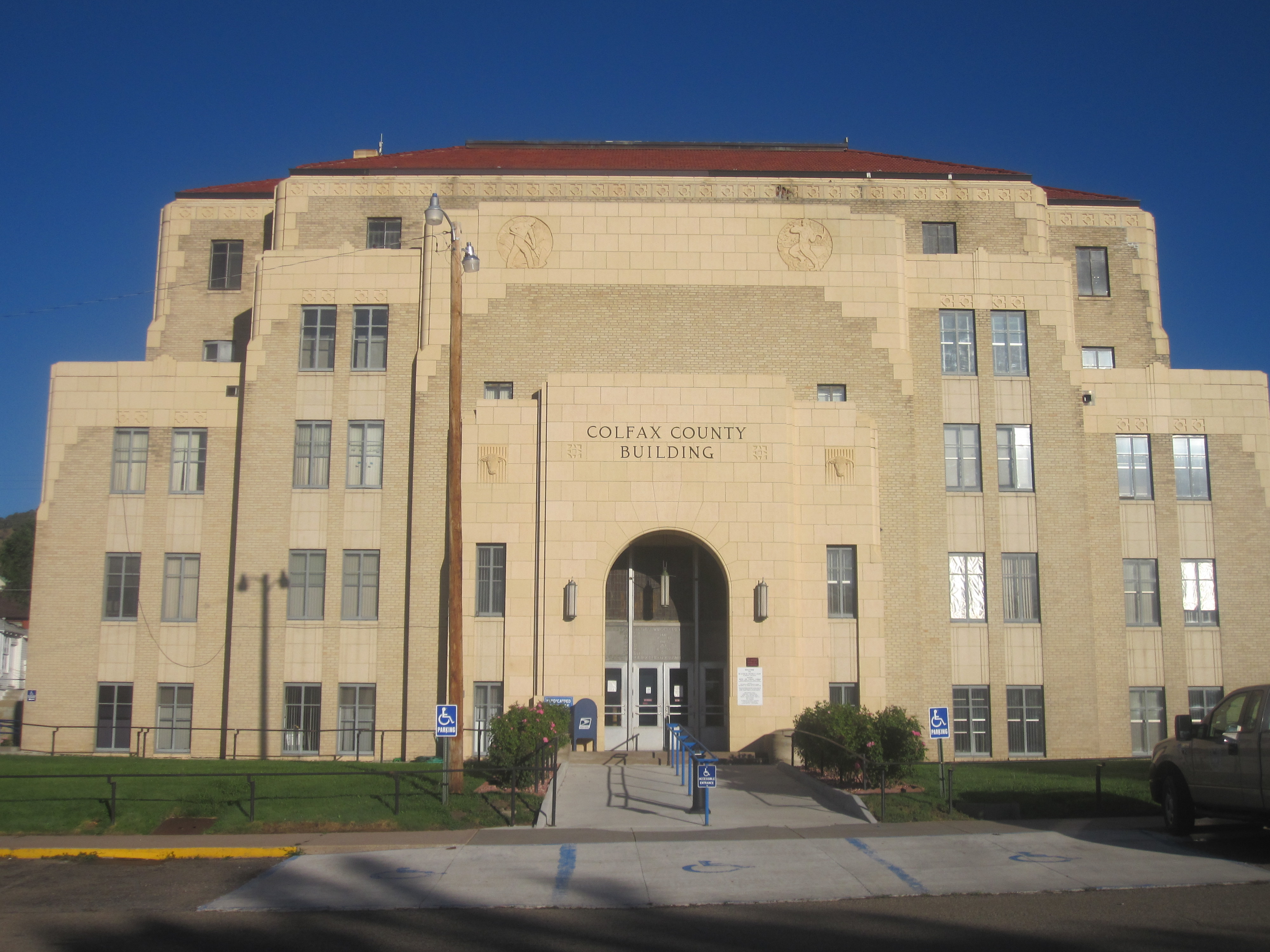
Colfax County Courthouse, Raton, New Mexico

Building	Historic District	Location	Date	Reference
Allison Building	Gallup Commercial Historic District	Gallup	1948	
Andres Z. Silva Conference Center (former Safeway)		Deming	1930s	
Art Annex		Albuquerque	1926	
Aztec Theatre		Aztec	1927, 1954	
Chief Theater		Gallup	1920	
Colfax County Courthouse		Raton	1939	
Columbian School		Raton	1936	
Conoco Service Station, 22 East Spruce		Deming	1935	
Curry County Courthouse		Clovis	1936	
Dr. P.E. Hale Office Building		Clovis	1940s	
Excelsior Laundry Building (now AmeriPride Linen & Apparel)		Albuquerque	1940s	
Flickenger Center for Performing Arts		Alamogordo	1956	
Hendren Building		Albuquerque	1946	
Hiland Theater		Albuquerque	1950	
Hotel Clovis Lofts		Clovis	1931	
James Bickley Elementary School		Clovis	1932	
Jones Motor Company		Albuquerque	1939	
Kearny School		Raton	1939	
KiMo Theater		Albuquerque	1927	
Longfellow School		Raton	1939	
Lea County Courthouse		Lovington	1936	
Lea Theater		Lovington	1948	
Lensic Theater		Santa Fe	1931	
Lincoln County Book Depository, 402 Central Street	Carrizozo Commercial Historic District	Carrizozo		
Los Alamos United States Post Office		Los Alamos	1948	
Luna Theater		Clayton	1916	
Lembke House		Albuquerque	1933	
Lyceum Theater		Clovis	1920, 1940s	
Maisel's Indian Trading Post, 510 Central SW		Albuquerque	1939	
Mountainair Municipal Auditorium		Mountainair	1934	
Nob Hill Business Center		Albuquerque	1947	
Odeon Theater		Tucumcari	1936	
Oñate Theatre		Belen	1939	
Princess Theater (former H-H Theater)		Tucumcari	1917, 1938	
Quay County Courthouse		Tucumcari	1936	
Raton Armory		Raton	1940	
Raton Courthouse		Raton		
Raton Fire Department		Raton		
Raton Junior-Senior High School		Raton	1939	
Roosevelt County Courthouse		Portales	1938	
Sands Theatre		Alamogordo	1937	
Sara Raynolds Hall		Albuquerque	1921	
Sears, 211 South Copper Street		Deming	1941	
Senior Center (former Hot Springs High School)		Truth or Consequences	1930	
Shaffer Hotel		Mountainair	1923, 1929	
Skinner Building		Albuquerque	1931	
State Theater		Clovis	1936	
Studio 519, 519 Central Avenue		Albuquerque		
Sutton's Bakery		Clovis	1946	
Valiant Printing		Albuquerque	1918, 1940s	
Wright Building		Farmington	1911, 1949	
Wool Warehouse		Albuquerque	1929	
Wright's Trading Post (now New Mexico Holocaust and Intolerance Museum)		Albuquerque		

== North Dakota ==
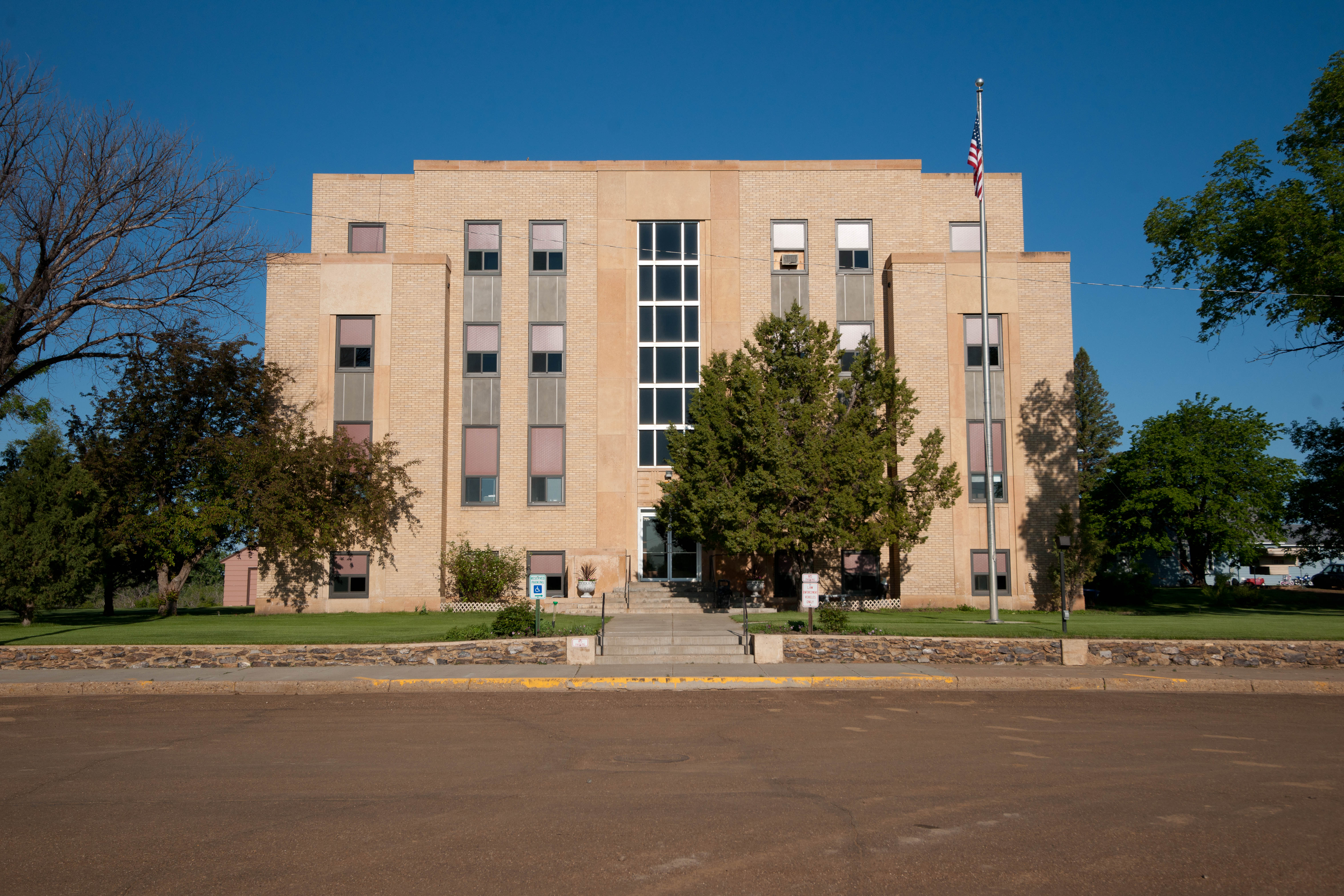
Hettinger County Courthouse, Mott, North Dakota

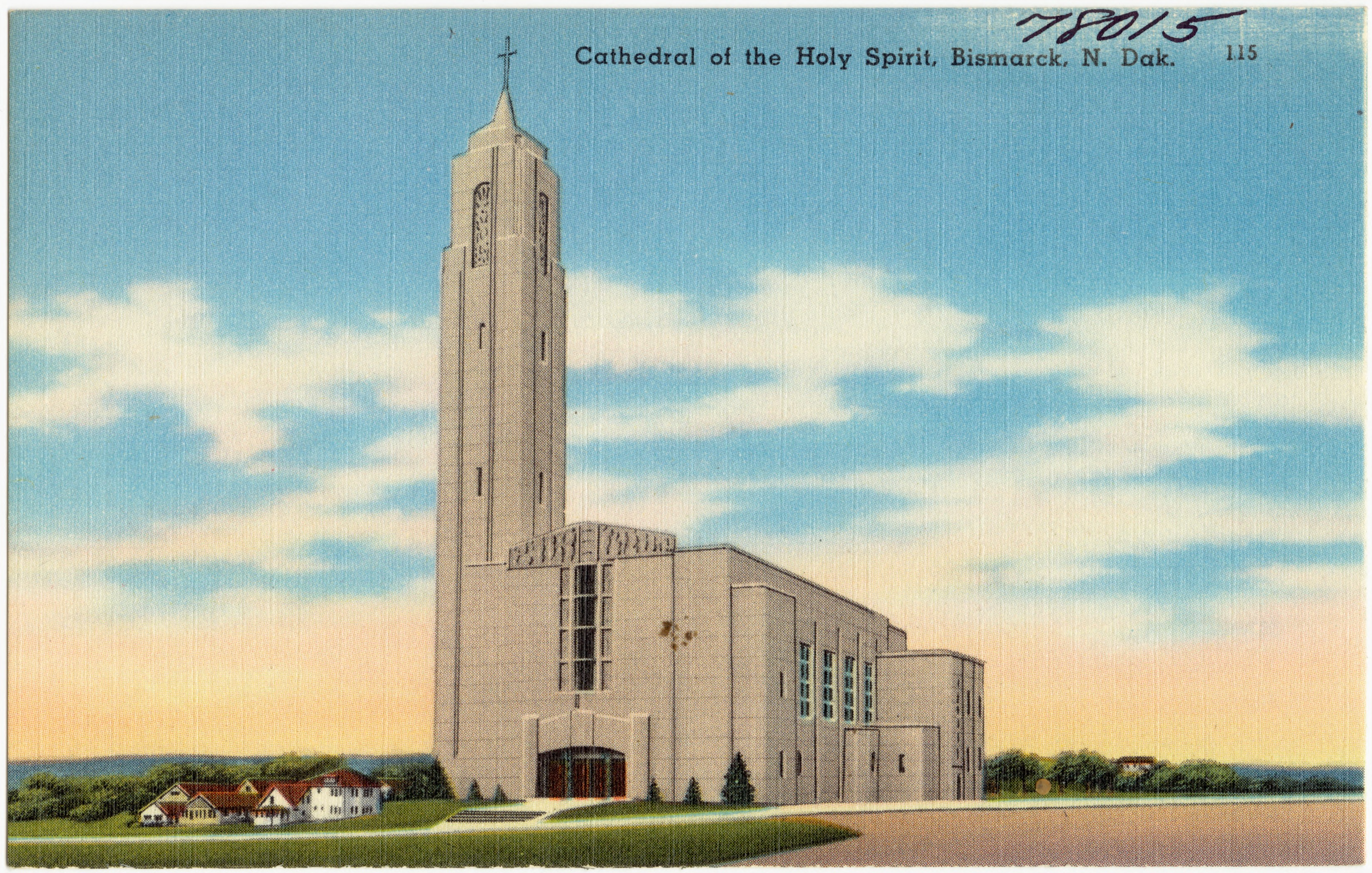
Cathedral of the Holy Spirit, Bismarck, North Dakota

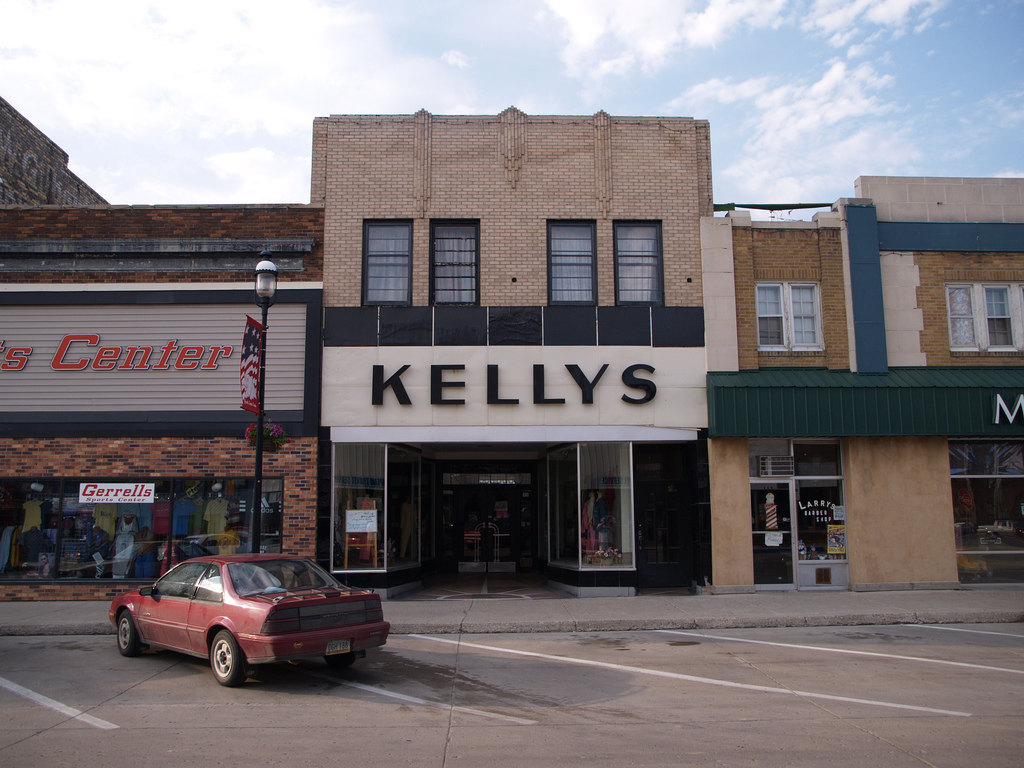
Kellys Building, Devils Lake, North Dakota

Building	Historic District	Location	Date	Reference
Adams County Courthouse		Hettinger	1928	
Avalon Theater		Larimore	1938	
Belfield Theater and Performance Center		Belfield		
Bentson/Bunker Fieldhouse		Fargo	1931	
Bismarck Airport Aero Center		Bismarc	1930s	
Bismarck High School		Bismarc		
Black Building		Fargo	1931	
B'nai Israel Synagogue and Montefiore Cemetery		Grand Forks	1937	
Botno Theatre		Bottineau	1932	
Burleigh County Courthouse		Bismarc	1931	
Capital Financial Services Building (former First National Bank)		Minot	1928	
Cathedral of the Holy Spirit and Bishop's Residence		Bismarc	1945	
Cavalier Theatre		Cavalier	1949	
Citizens Building		Wahpeton		
Central Middle School		Devils Lake	1936	
Christie Building	Devils Lake Commercial District	Devils Lake	1920	
Crystal Springs School (former Progressive School)		Crystal Springs	1920	
Computer Store/Cookie's New Image		Devils Lake	1920s	
Delchar Theater		Mayville	1927	
Edgar Building		Grand Forks	1906	
Edinburg WPA Auditorium		Edinburg	1938	
Emmons County Courthouse		Linton	1934	
Fargo Theatre		Fargo	1926	
Grand Forks Central High School Auditorium		Grand Forks	1936	
Grand Forks County Fairgrounds WPA Structures		Grand Forks	1936, 1939	
Grand Forks Herald Newspaper Offices		Grand Forks	1931, 1959	
Hettinger County Courthouse		Mott	1934	
Ivers Building (former Apartments and Funeral Home)		Fargo	1929	
Kellys Building	Devils Lake Commercial District	Devils Lake	1937	
Lake Theatre	Devils Lake Commercial District	Devils Lake	1936	
Memorial Hall		Flasher	1936	
Mysteria Theater		Mandan	1936	
Mountrail County War Memorial Auditorium		Stanley	1926	
New England Veterans Memorial Auditorium		New England	1937	
Nicola Building	Downtown Bismarck Historic District	Bismarc	1930	
Nash–Finch Warehouse	Downtown Bismarck Historic District	Bismarc	1930s	
North Dakota State Capitol		Bismarc	1924–1934	
Pauls Appliance Building	Devils Lake Commercial District	Devils Lake	1920	
Park River City Auditorium		Pak River	1938	
Ransom County Courthouse		Lisbon	1937	
Renville County Courthouse		Mohal	1937	
Robinson Hall		Robinson	1935	
Roxy Theatre		Langdon	1936	
Sheridan County Courthouse		McClusky	1938	
Stark County Courthouse		Dickinson	1937	
Strand Theatre		Grafton	1946	
United Lutheran Church		Grand Forks	1932	
United States Post Office		Langdon	1938	
Union Storage & Transfer Cold Storage Warehouse and Armour Creamery Building		Fargo	1930	
Valley City Municipal Auditorium		Valley City	1936	
Venturia Village Hall		Venturia	1937	
VFW Building		Fargo	1908, 1940	
Walsh County Courthouse		Grafton	1940	
War Memorial Building (Ramsey County Memorial Building and Armory)	Devils Lake Commercial District	Devils Lake	1934	
Ward County Courthouse		Minot	1929	
Williston High School		Williston	1934	
Wishek Civic Center		Wishek	1942	
World War Memorial Building	Downtown Bismarck Historic District	Bismarc	1930	
Ziegler's Fabrics Building	Devils Lake Commercial District	Devils Lake	1930	

== Rhode Island ==
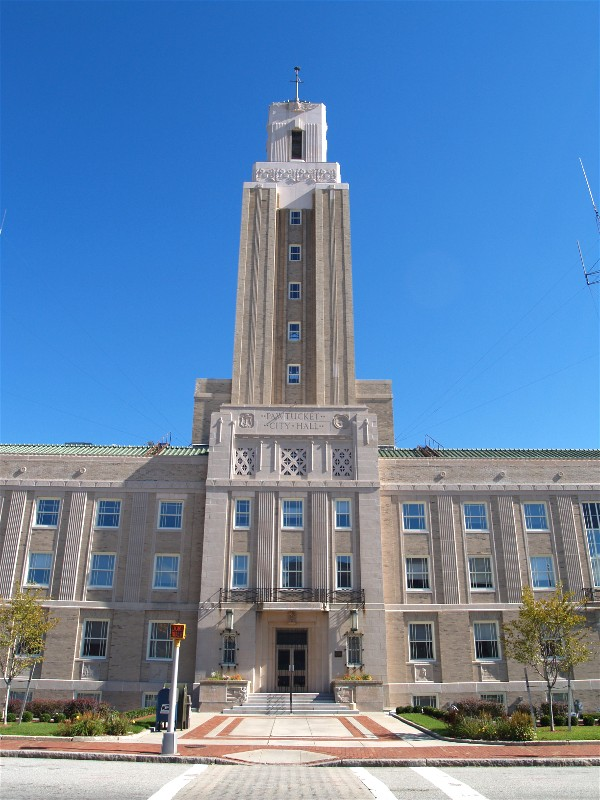
Pawtucket City Hall, Pawtucket, Rhode Island

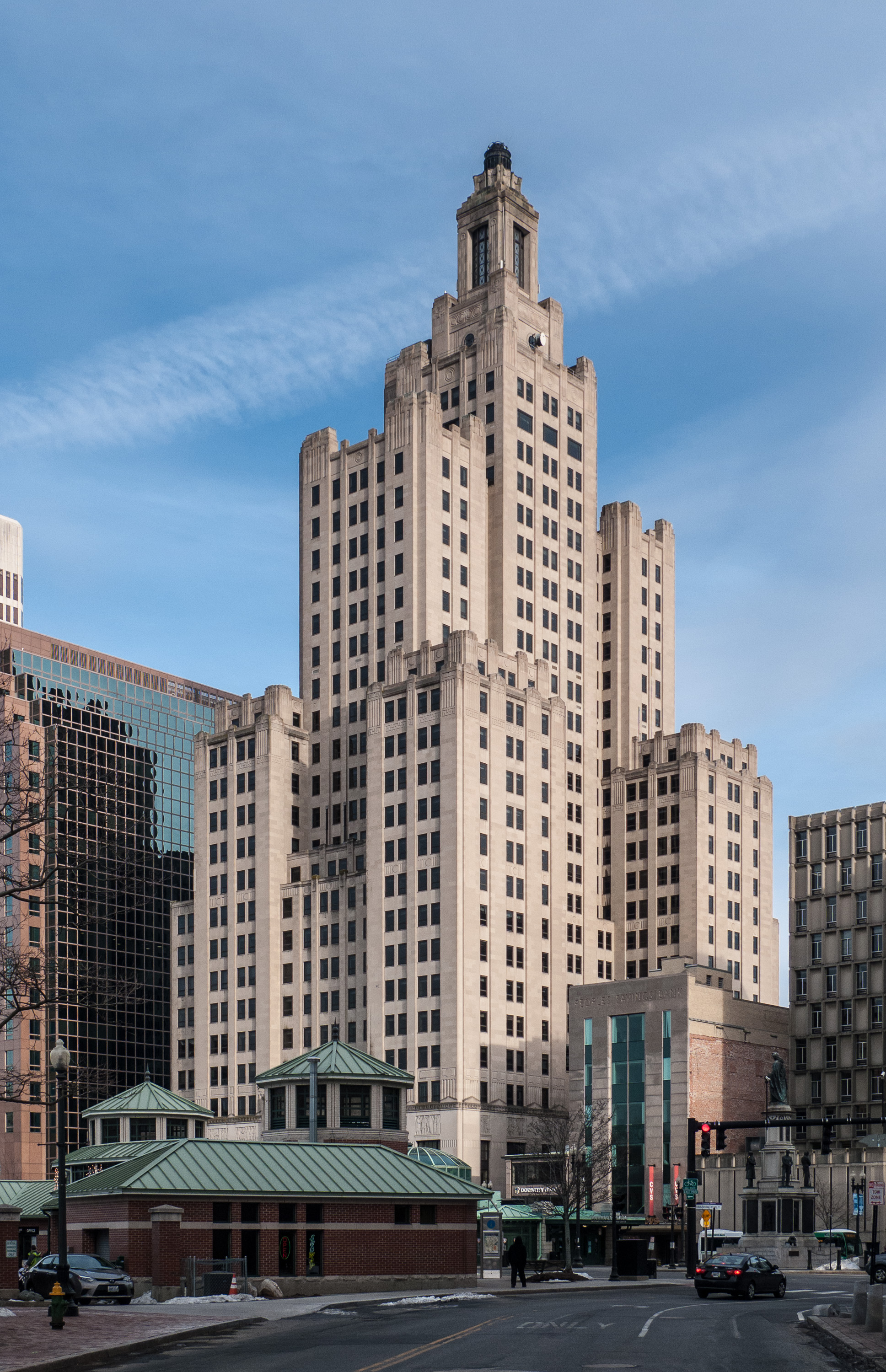
Industrial National Bank Building, Providence, Rhode Island

Building	Historic District	Location	Date	Reference
Avon Cinema		Providence	1938	
Cal-Art Tower		Providence	1939	
Coro Company Building		Providence	1929	
Fain's Fine Carpet & Rugs		Providence	1934	
Gloria Dei Evangelical Lutheran Church		Providence	1928	
Gilbane's Service Center Building		Pawtucket	1931	
Industrial National Bank Building		Providence	1928	
O'Gorman Building, 220 Westminster		Providence	1925	
Pawtucket City Hall		Pawtucket	1933	
Peerless Cleaners		Providence		
Peoples Savings Bank		Providence	1948	
Poirier's Diner		Providence	1947	
Providence Fruit and Produce Warehouse Company Building		Providence	1929	
Rhode Island State Airport Terminal		Warwick	1932	
Rosedale Apartments		Cranston	1939	
St. Rocco's Church		Johnston	1951	
Samuel Gorton Junior High School		Warwick	1939	
Shea High School		Pawtucket	1938	
State Armory of Mounted Commands and Garage		Providence	1937	
State Board of Public Roads Building		Providence	1931	
Tercat Tool & Die, Providence		Providence	1941	

== South Carolina ==
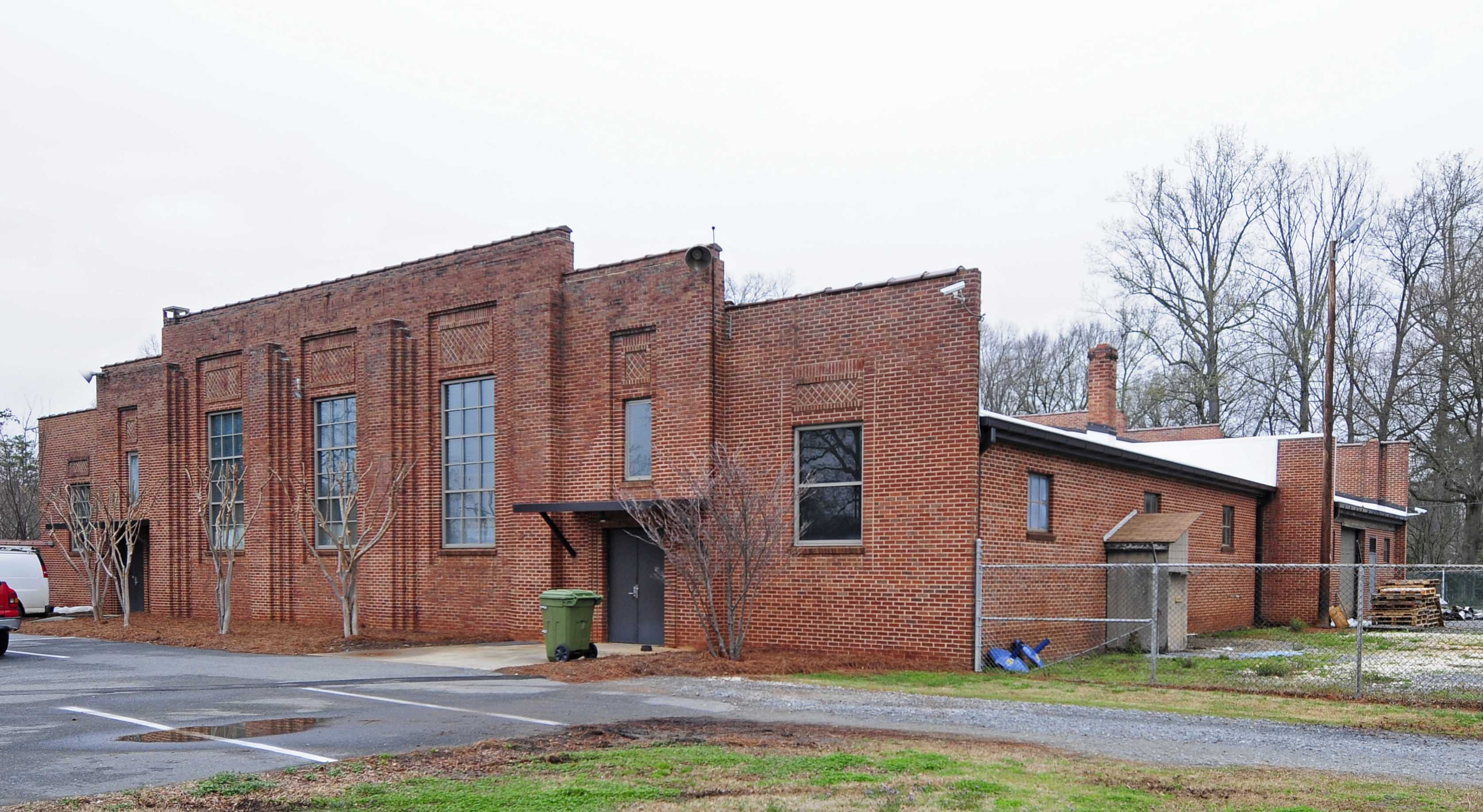
National Guard Armory, Fort Mill, South Carolina

Building	Historic District	Location	Date	Ref
ACT Theatre (former State Theatre)		Anderson	1939	
Bouharoun's Package Store		Greenville	1946	
Capitol Theatre		Union City	1927	
Carolina Theatre		Allendale	1920s	
Center Theatre		Hartsville	1936	
Carver Theatre		Columbia	1941	
Chase Furniture		Charleston	1946	
Columbia Central Fire Station		Columbia	1951	
County Hall, 1000 King Street Apartments		Charleston	1941	
First National Bank		Greenville	1938	
Fountain Inn High School		Fountain Inn	1939	
Good Samaritan-Waverly Hospital		Columbia	1952	
Greyhound Bus Depot		Columbia	1939	
Hamrick Theatre	Gaffney Commercial Historic District	Gaffney	1930	
Hartsville Armory		Darlington	1940	
Hartsville Community Center-Hartsville Community Market		Hartsville	1935	
Hill Building	Darlington Downtown Historic District	Darlington	1892, 1931	
Lexington County Courthouse		Lexington	1939	
National Guard Armory		Fort Mill	1938	
Newberry Firehouse		Newberry	1930s	
North Columbia Fire Station No. 7		Columbia	1948	
Olympia Armory		Olympia	1936	
Outdoor Theater, Clemson University		Clemson	1940	
Palmetto Theatre		Hampton	1946	
Raymond Price House		Columbia	1952	
Riviera Theater, Charleston		Charleston	1939	
Saluda Theatre		Saluda	1936	
S. H. Kress and Co. Building		Columbia	1934	
Town Theatre		Columbia	1934	
Wade Hampton State Office Building		Columbia	1940	

== South Dakota ==
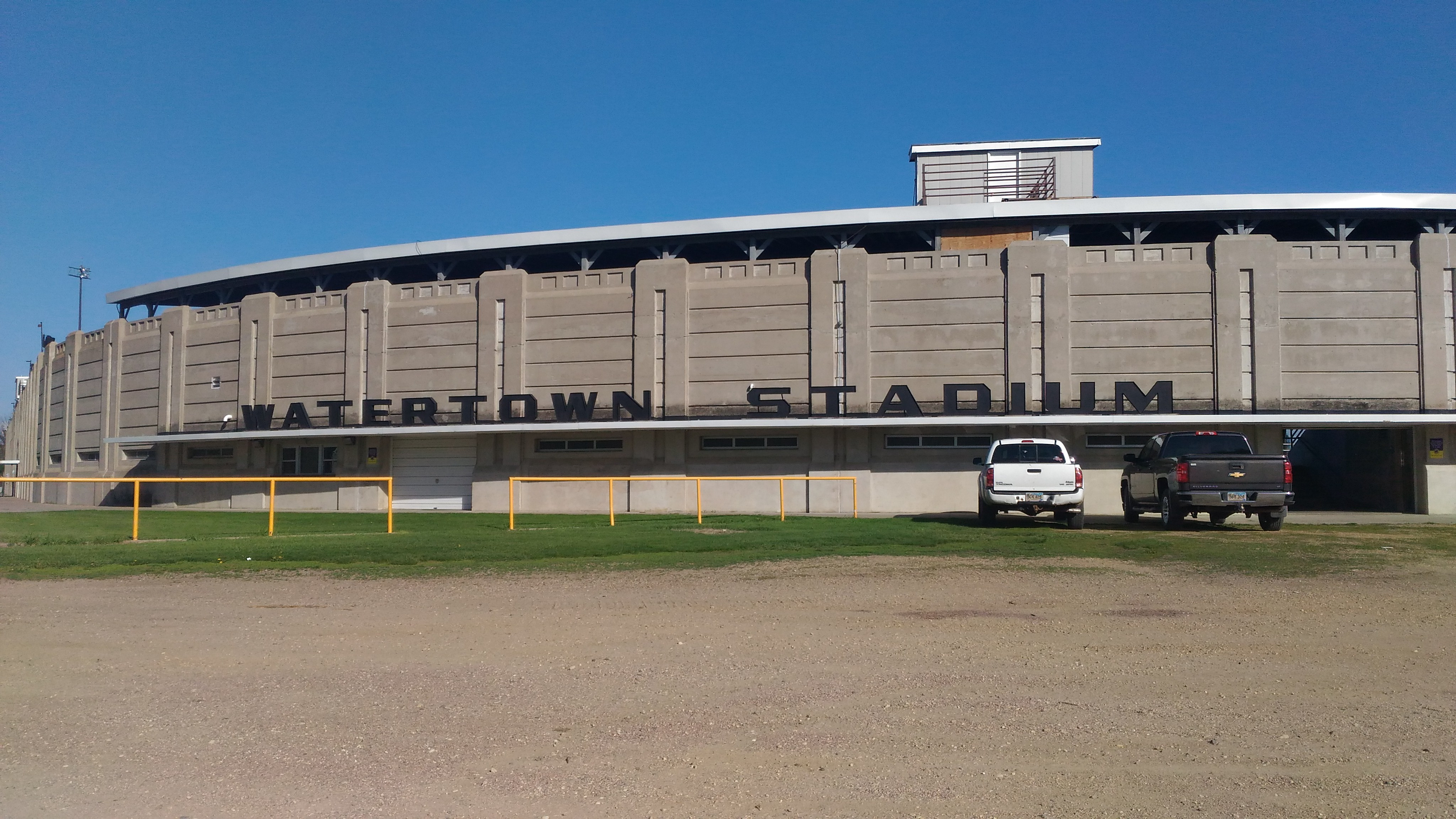
Watertown Stadium, Watertown, South Dakota

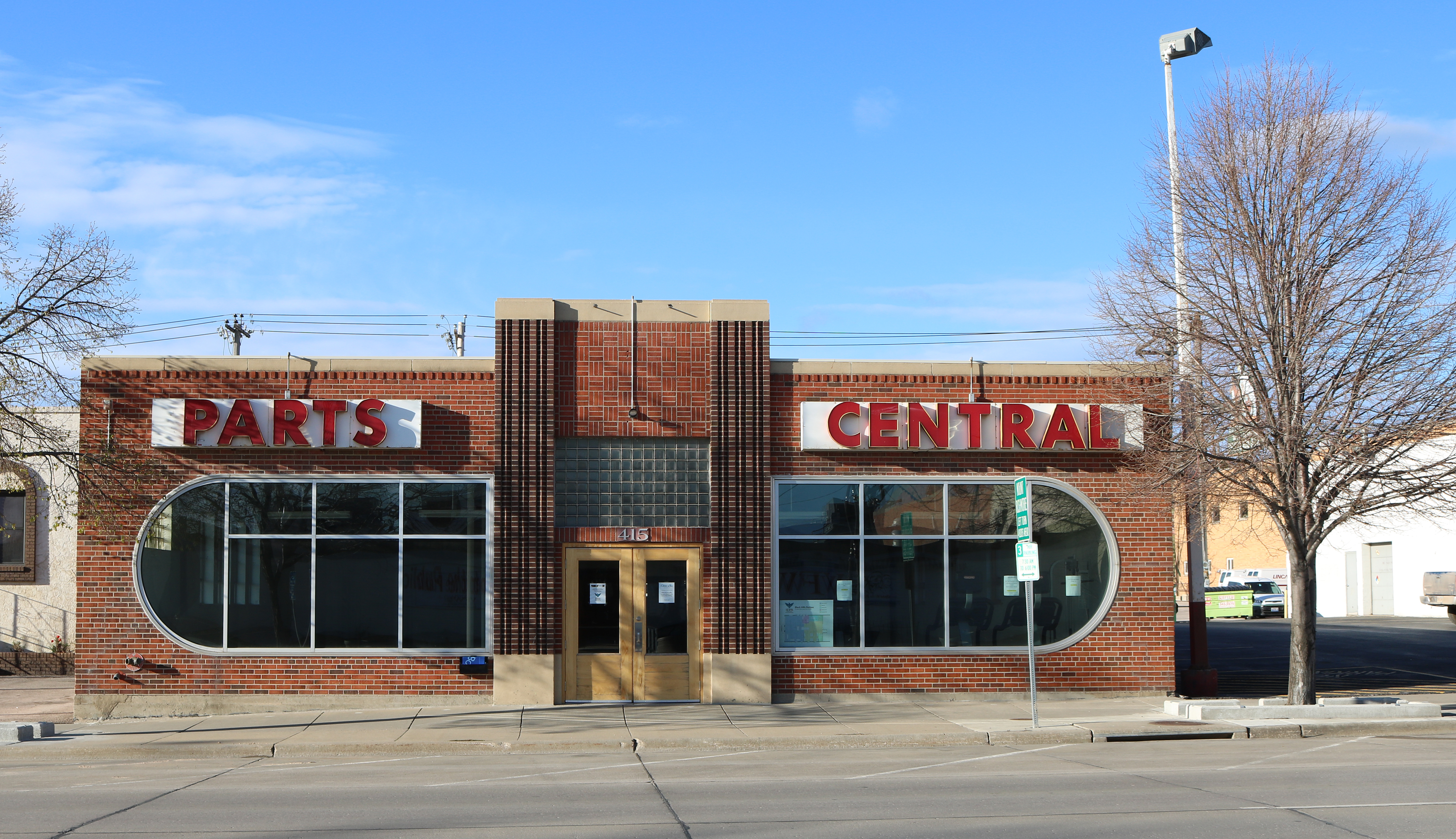
Casper Supply Company, Rapid City, South Dakota

Building	Historic District	Location	Date	Reference
Auditorium–Armory		Brookings	1937	
Aurora County Courthouse		Plankinton	1940	
Baltic School		Baltic	1941	
Capitol Theatre		Aberdeen	1927	
Casper Supply Company		Rapid City	1946	
City Auditorium		Hill City	1938	
City Hall		Lead	1937	
City Hall		Sioux Falls	1936	
Clark County Courthouse		Clark	1934	
College Theater		Brookings	1941	
Dakota Theatre		Yankton	1902, 1921	
Davison County Courthouse		Mitchell	1936	
Dell Rapids		Dell Rapids	1938	
Edmunds County Courthouse		Ipswich	1931	
F. W. Woolworth Building		Brookings	1937	
Faith Municipal Building		Faith	1941	
Haakon County Courthouse		Phillip	1930	
Haines Block		Rapid City	1918	
Hall Building		Rapid City	1884, 1930s	
Hand County Courthouse and Jail		Miller	1927	
Hughes County Courthouse		Pierre	1934	
Hyde County Memorial Auditorium		Highmore	1951	
Inland Theater		Martin	1925	
International Vinegar Museum		Roslyn	1936	
Java Public Library		Java	1930s	
Jerauld County Courthouse		Wessington Springs	1930	
Koch Apartments		Mitchell	1938	
Lake County Courthouse		Madison	1935	
Lead–Deadwood High School		Lead	1940	
Lincoln County Jail and Sheriff's House		Canton	1938	
McCook County Courthouse		Salem	1934	
Miner County Courthouse		Howard	1936	
Mobridge Auditorium		Mobridge	1936, 1942	
Mobridge Masonic Temple		Mobridge	1923	
O'Harra Memorial Building, South DakotaSchool of Mines and Technology		Rapid City	1940s	
Pioneer Park Bandshell		Brookings	1936	
Rapid City Business College		Rapid City	1919	
Rapid City Laundry		Rapid City	1929	
Rude's Home Furnishings		Brookings		
Security Building		Rapid City	1928	
Spearfish City Hall		Spearfish		
Sturgis Armory Auditorium		Sturgis	1936	
Swander Bakery Building		Rapid City	1928, 1949	
United States Post Office		Beresford	1939	
United States Post Office		Spearfish	1940	
United States Post Office and Courthouse		Aberdeen	1936	
Watertown Stadium		Watertown	1940	

== Tennessee ==
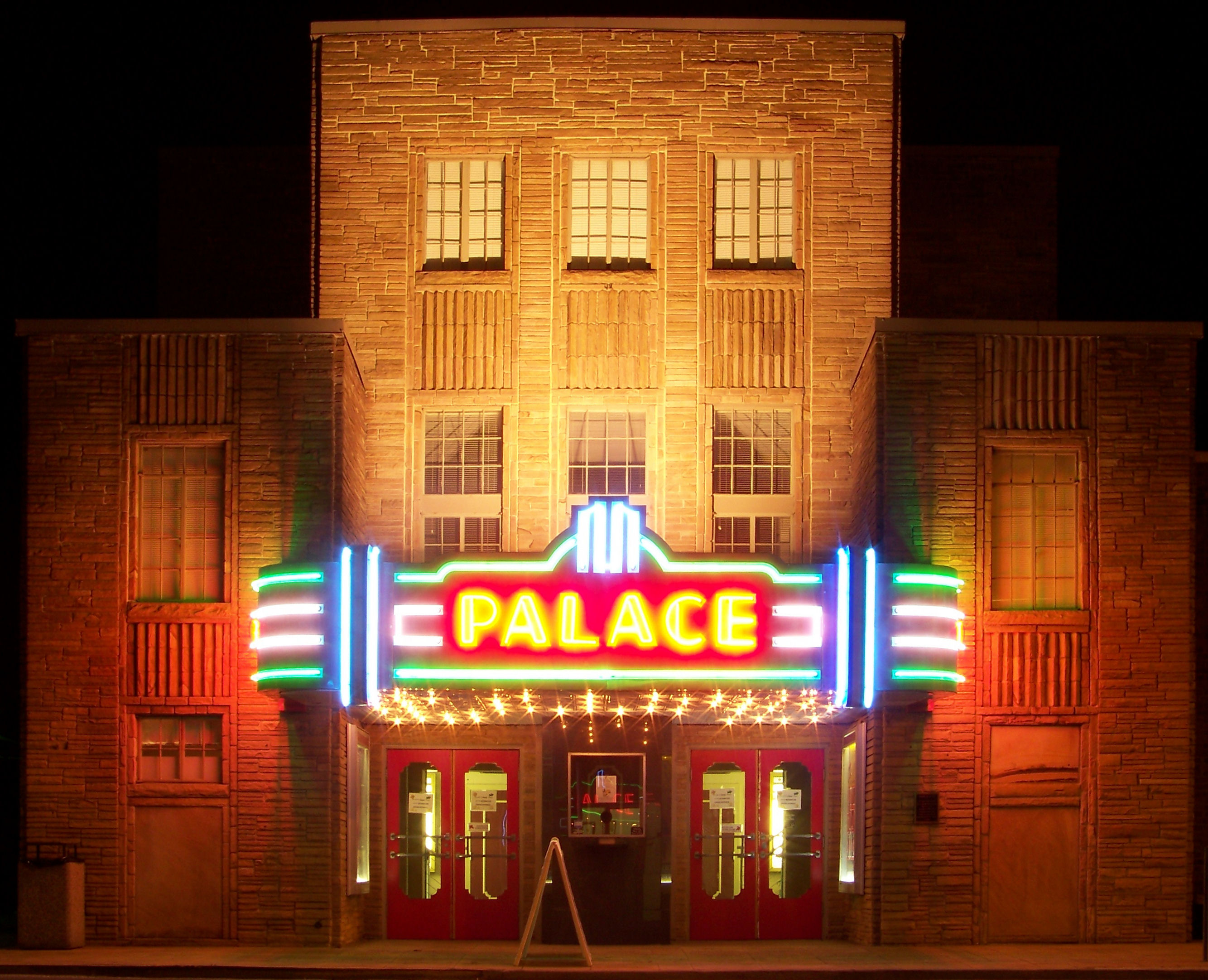
Palace Theatre, Crossville, Tennessee

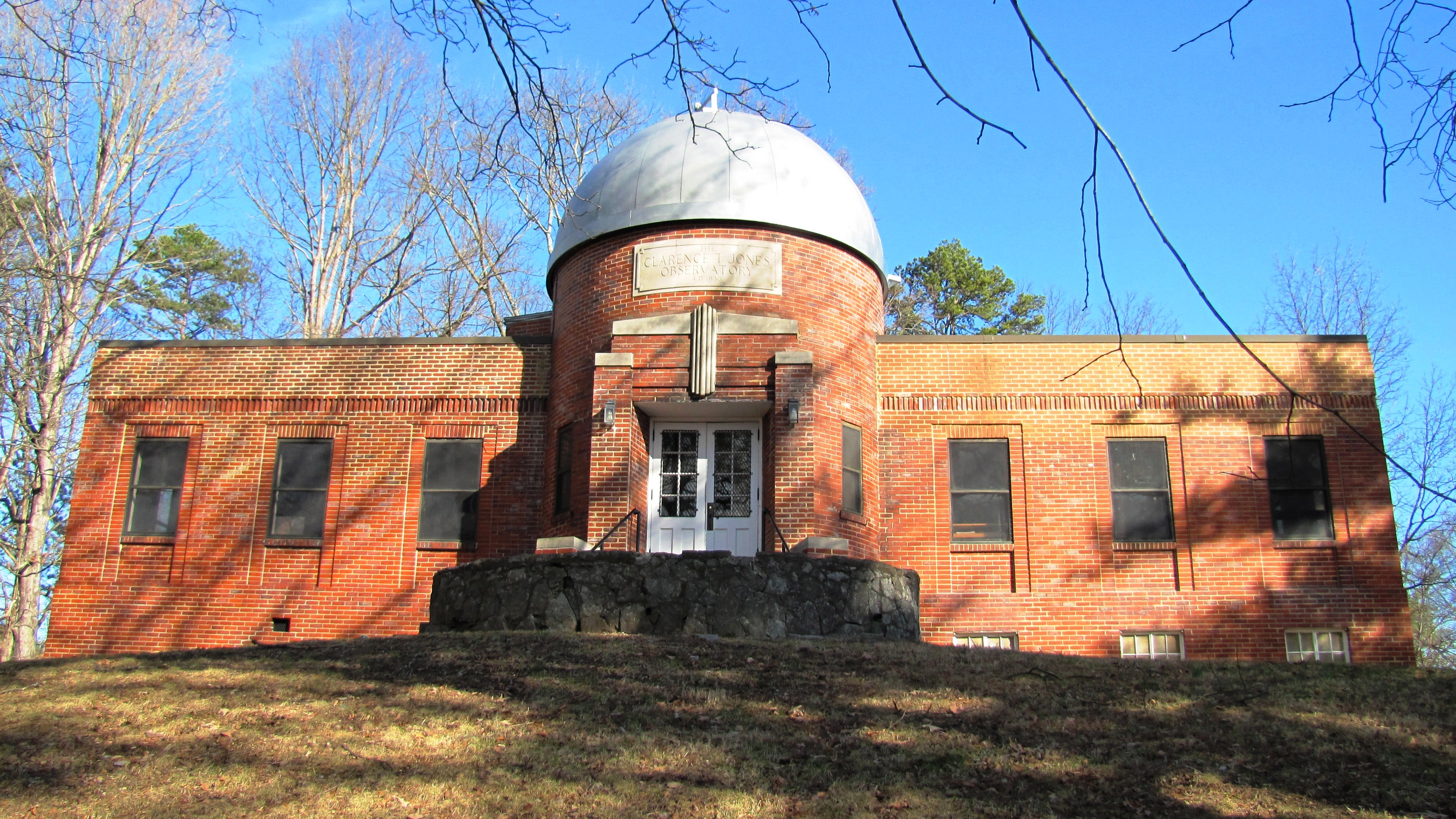
Clarence T. Jones Observatory, Chattanooga, Tennessee

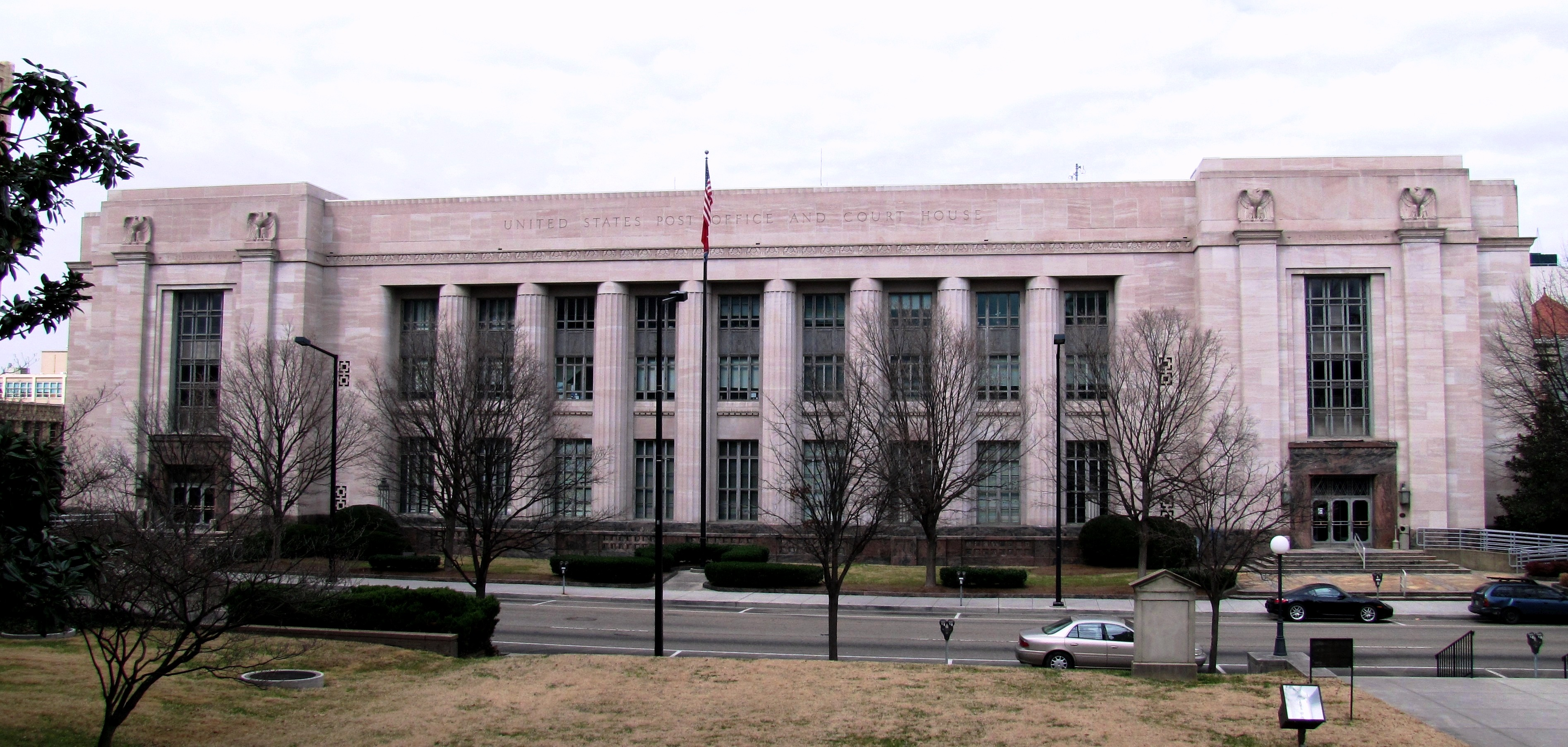
United States Post Office and Courthouse, Knoxville, Tennessee

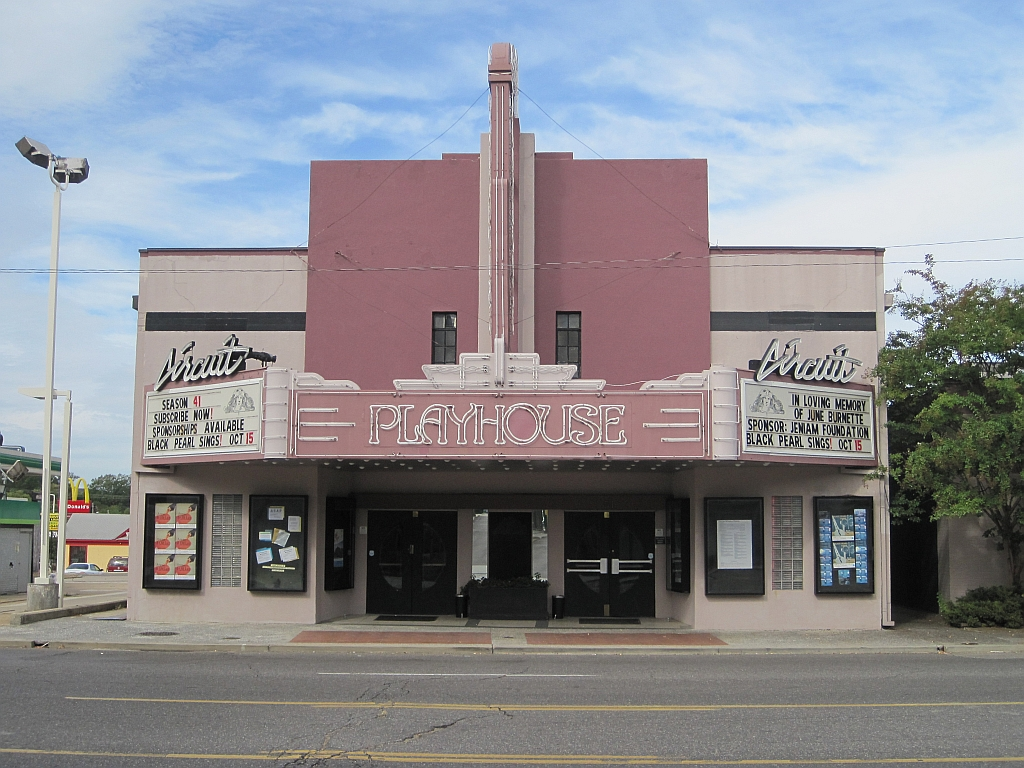
Circuit Playhouse, Memphis, Tennessee

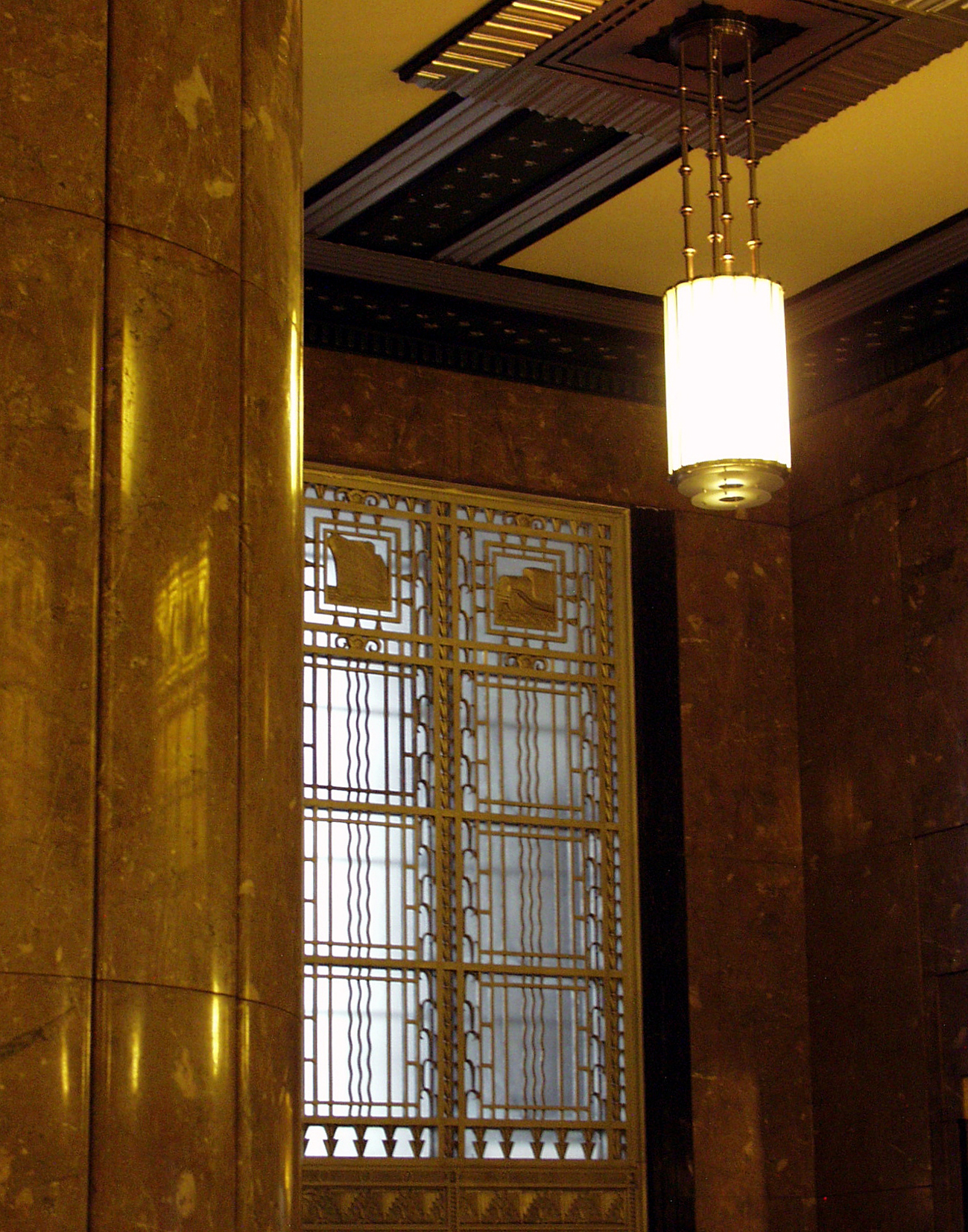
Frisk Art Museum, Nashville, Tennessee

Building	Historic District	Location	Date	Reference
Bledsoe County Jail		Pikesville	1937	
Castner–Knott Building		Nashville	1906, 1958	
Chattanooga Bank Building		Chattanooga	1927	
Circuit Playhouse (former American Theatre, Memphian Theatre)		Memphis	1928, 1935	
Clarence T. Jones Observatory		Chattanooga	1938	
Cockrill School		Nashville	1940	
Cordell Hull State Office Building		Nashville	1954	
Court Theatre		Huntingdon	1929	
Courtyard Nashville Downtown		Nashville	1936	
Crockett Theatre		Lawrenceburg	1950	
Crosstown Concourse		Memphis	1927	
Davidson County Courthouse		Nashville	1937	
Daylight Building		Knoxville	1927	
Dermon Building		Memphis	1925	
Dixie Greyhound Bus Lines Complex		Memphis	1937	
Fairview Junior High School		Memphis	1930	
Federal Building (former United States Post Office and Courthouse)		Columbia	1941	
Franklin County Courthouse		Winchester	1937	
Franklin Theatre		Franklin	1941	
Frist Art Museum		Nashville	1932	
Greyhound Bus Statio		Jackson	1938	
Greyhound Half-Way House		Waverly	1938	
Gunter Building	Shelbyville Courthouse Square Historic District	Shelbyville	1929	
Hardle & Caudle		Chattanooga	1923	
James Robertson Hotel		Nashville	1929	
Joel W. Solomon Federal Building and U.S. Courthouse		Chattanooga	1932	
John Sevier State Office Building		Nashville	1940	
Knox Central (former Sears Building)		Knoxville	1948	
Kingsport Parks and Recreation Administrative Offices (former Civic Auditorium)		Kingsport	1940	
Lauderdale County Courthouse		Ripley	1936	
Levitt Shell (former Overton Park Band Shell)		Memphis	1936	
Lewis County Courthouse		Hohenwald	1939	
Madison County Courthouse		Jackson	1937	
Mason Temple		Memphis	1945	
Marion Post No. 62 American Legion Hall		South Pittsburg	1926	
Martin Luther King Magnet at Pearl High School		Nashville	1936	
Medical Arts Building		Chattanooga	1928	
Memorial Gymnasium		Murfreesboro	1927	
Memphis Children's Museum (former National Guard Armory)		Memphis	1943	
Miller Department Store (Knoxville Utility Board)		Knoxville	1935	
Molyneux Chevrolet Company Building		Rockwood	1927	
Montgomery High School		Lexington	1948	
Nashville Arcade		Nashville	1902	
National Guard Armory (now Armory Recreation and Fitness Center)		Columbia	1942	
New Daisy Theatre		Memphis	1936	
Obion County Courthouse		Union City	1939	
Oldham Theatre		Winchester	1949	
Palace Theater		Crossville	1938	
Paramount Theatre and Office Building		Bristol	1930	
Polk County Courthouse		Benton	1937	
Princess Theatre		Harriman	1939	
R. L. Coulston & Sons Building Materials		Covington	1930s	
Rich–Schwartz Building		Nashville	1936	
Ritz Theatre		Clinton	1945	
Riviera Theatre		Knoxville	1920	
Roxy Regional Theatre		Clarksville	1915, 1941	
Ruffin Theatre		Covington	1937	
S&W Cafeteria (now Douglas J. Aveda Institute)		Knoxville	1936	
S. H. Kress and Co. Building		Knoxville	1925	
Sterick Building		Memphis	1928	
Sullivan Tower		Nashville	1940	
Sumner County Courthouse		Gallatin	1940	
Union City Armory		Union City	1941	
Union City Middle School		Union City	1930s	
United States Post Office		Dickson	1936	
United States Post Office		LaFollette	1937	
United States Post Office and Courthouse		Knoxville	1934	
Varsity Theatre		Martin	1949	
WJHL-TV		Johnson City	1937	
Wichman Monuments		Chattanooga	1946	
WREC Radio Transmitter		Memphis	1920	

== Utah ==
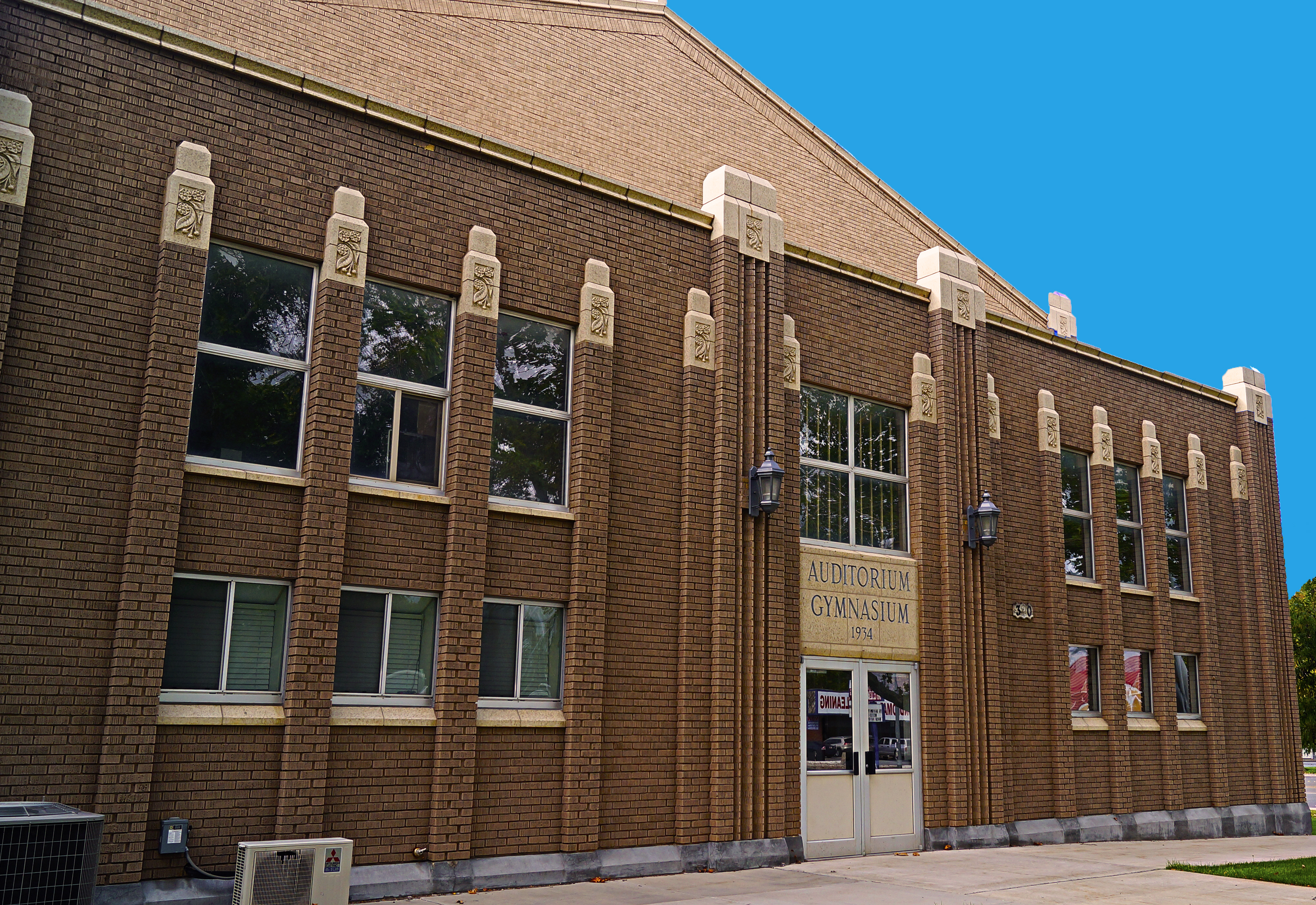
Spanish Fork High School Gymnasium, Spanish Fork, Utah

Building	Historic District	Location	Date	Reference
Cecil I. and Mildren H. Dimick House		Orem	1946	
Centre Theater		Salt Lake City	1937	
City Hall		Park City		
Crescent Elementary School		Sandy	1930	
Desert Star Theater		Murray	1930	
Family Life Building		Logan	1935	
Grand County Courthouse		Moab	1937	
Helper Civic Auditorium		Helper	1936	
Hinckley High School Gymnasium		Hinckley	1936	
Hush Theatre		Payson	1949	
Hush Theatre		Payson	1949	
Kanab Library		Kanab	1940	
Lewiston Community Building		Lewiston	1935	
Mary G. Steiner Egyptian Theatre		Park City	1926	
Memorial Hall Auditorium	Springville Historic District	Springville	1932	
Mount Pleasant National Guard Armory		Mount Pleasant	1937	
Murray Theater		Murray	1938	
North Ogden Elementary School		North Ogden		
Ogden Exchange Building		Ogden	1926	
Ogden High School		Ogden	1937	
Ogden/Weber Municipal Building		Ogden	1940	
Park City High School Mechanical Arts Building		Park City	1936	
Park City Public Auditorium		Park City	1939	
Peery's Egyptian Theater		Ogden	1924	
Redman Van and Storage Company Building Sugar House		Salt Lake City		
Richmond Community Building		Richmond	1937	
Road Island Diner		Oakley	1939	
Salina Municipal Building and Library		Salina	1937	
Sanpete County Courthouse		Manti	1935	
Santaquin Junior High School		Santaquin	1935	
SCERA Showhouse		Orem	1941	
Snelgrove's Ice Cream		Salt Lake City	1929	
Spanish Fork High School Gymnasium		Spanish Fork	1935	
Sugar House Monument		Salt Lake City	1930	
Superintendent's Residence at the Utah State Hospital		Provo	1934	
United States Forest Service Building		Ogden	1933	
Utah Theatre (former Roxy)		Logan		
Valley School		Orderville	1935	
W. P. Fuller Paint Company Office and Warehouse		Salt Lake City	1922, 1951	
Wayne County Courthouse		Loa	1939	
Yalecrest Ward Chapel		Salt Lake City	1936	

== Vermont ==
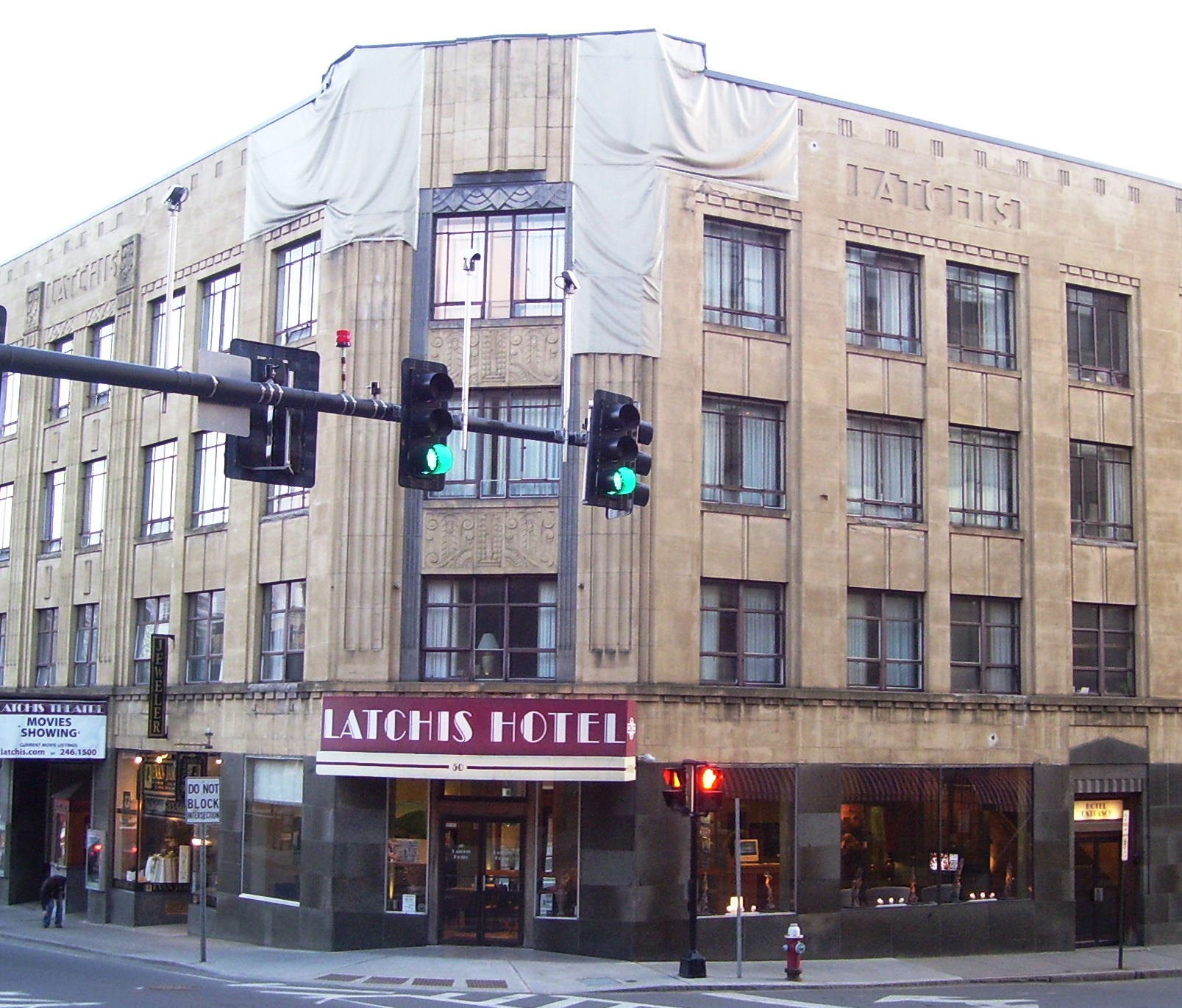
Latchis Hotel & Theatre, Brattleboro, Vermont

Building	Historic District	Location	Date	Reference
10 Church Street, Church Street Marketplace		Burlington	1877, 1936	
Capitol Theatre (former Playhouse Theatre)		Montpelier	1926, 1936	
Cone Block	Downtown Bennington Historic District	Bennington	1899, 1924	
Flynn Center for the Performing Arts		Burlington	1930s	
Kazon Building		Rutland	1929	
Latchis Hotel and Theatre		Brattleboro	1938	
Quinlan's Drug Store	Downtown Bennington Historic District	Bennington	1895, 1948	
Rutland Service Building		Rutland	1930	
State Office Building		Montpelier	1949	

== Washington, D.C. ==
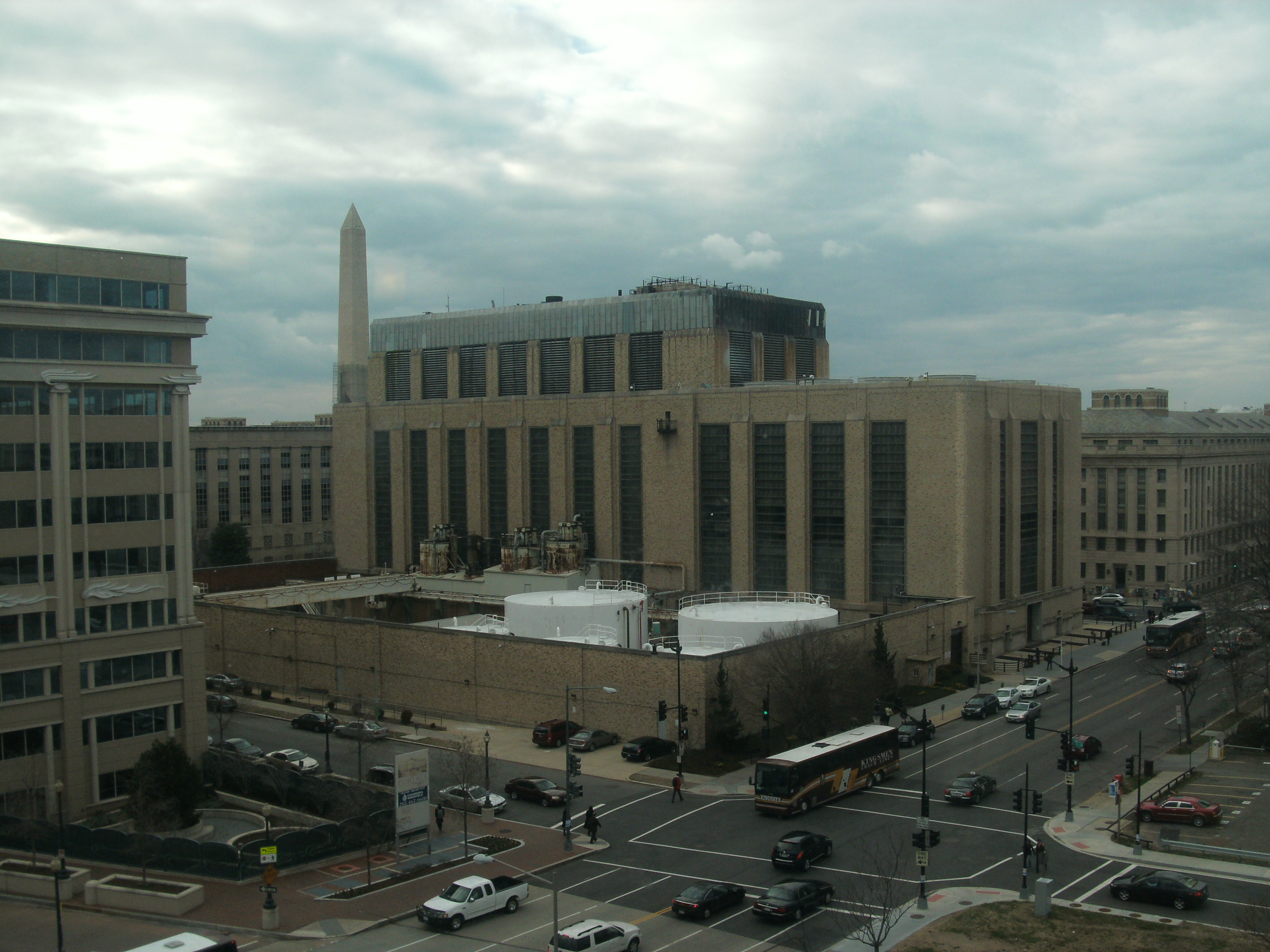
Central Heating Plant, Washington, D.C.

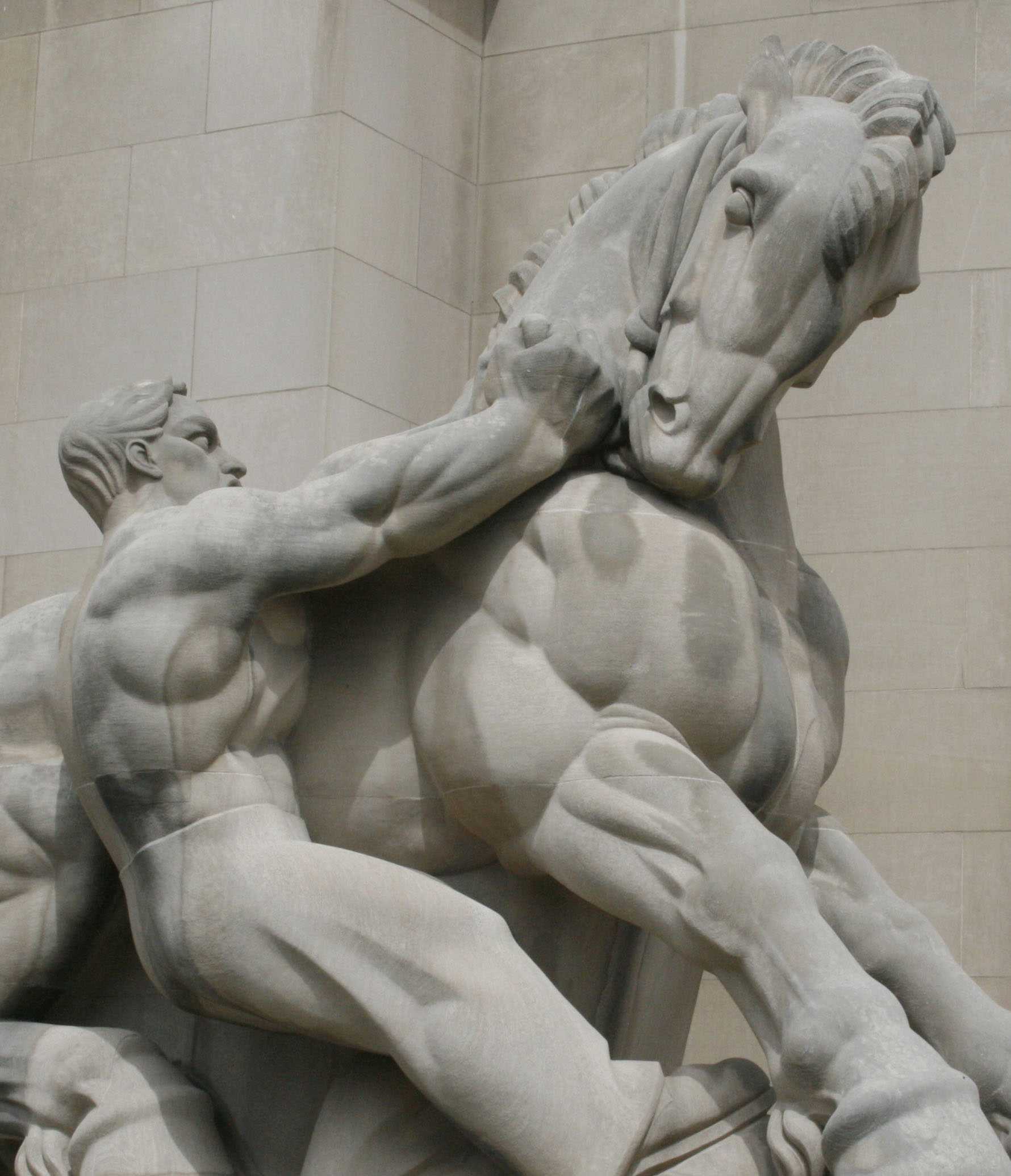
Federal Trade Commission Building, Washington, D.C.

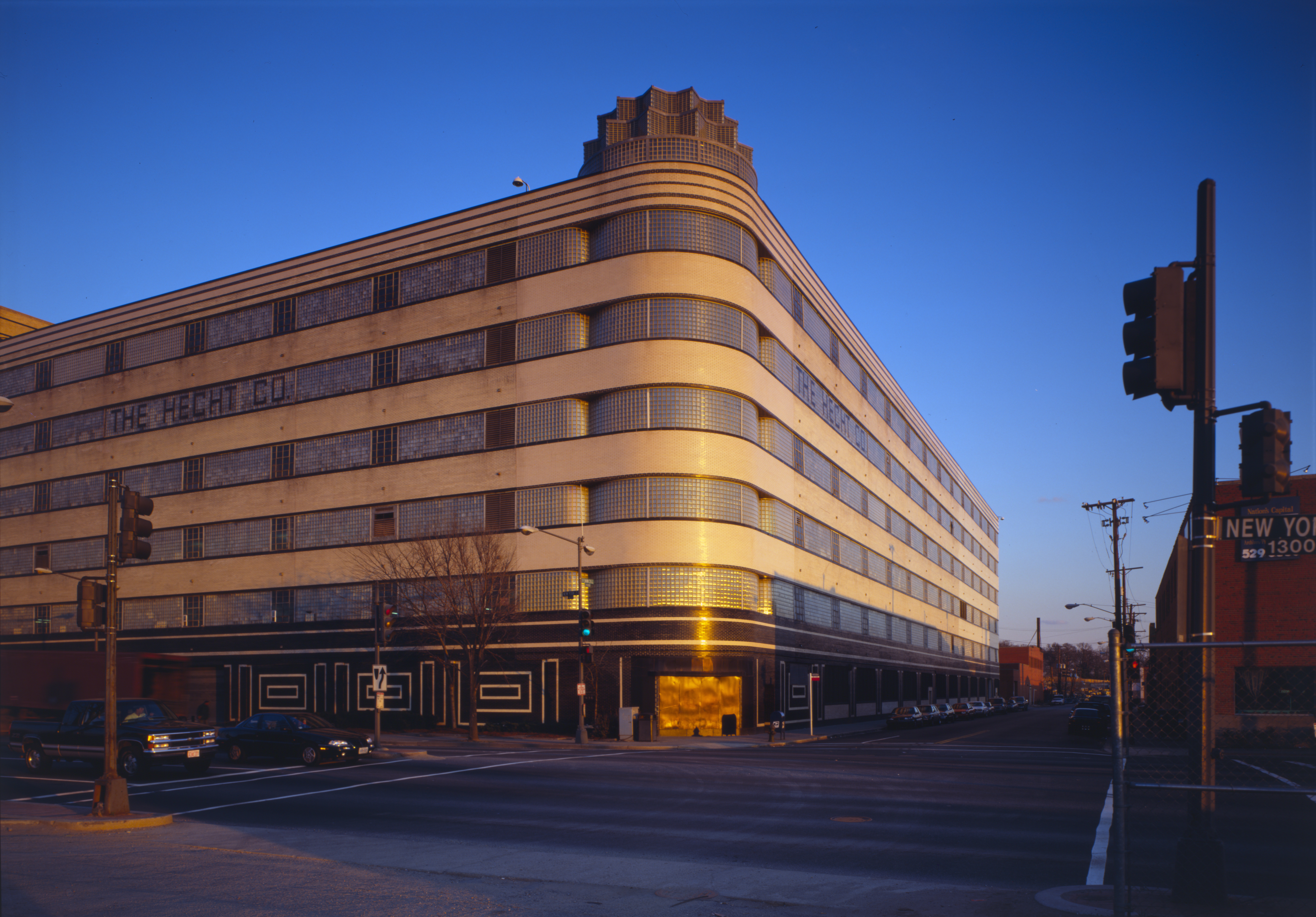
Hecht Company Warehouse, Washington, D.C.

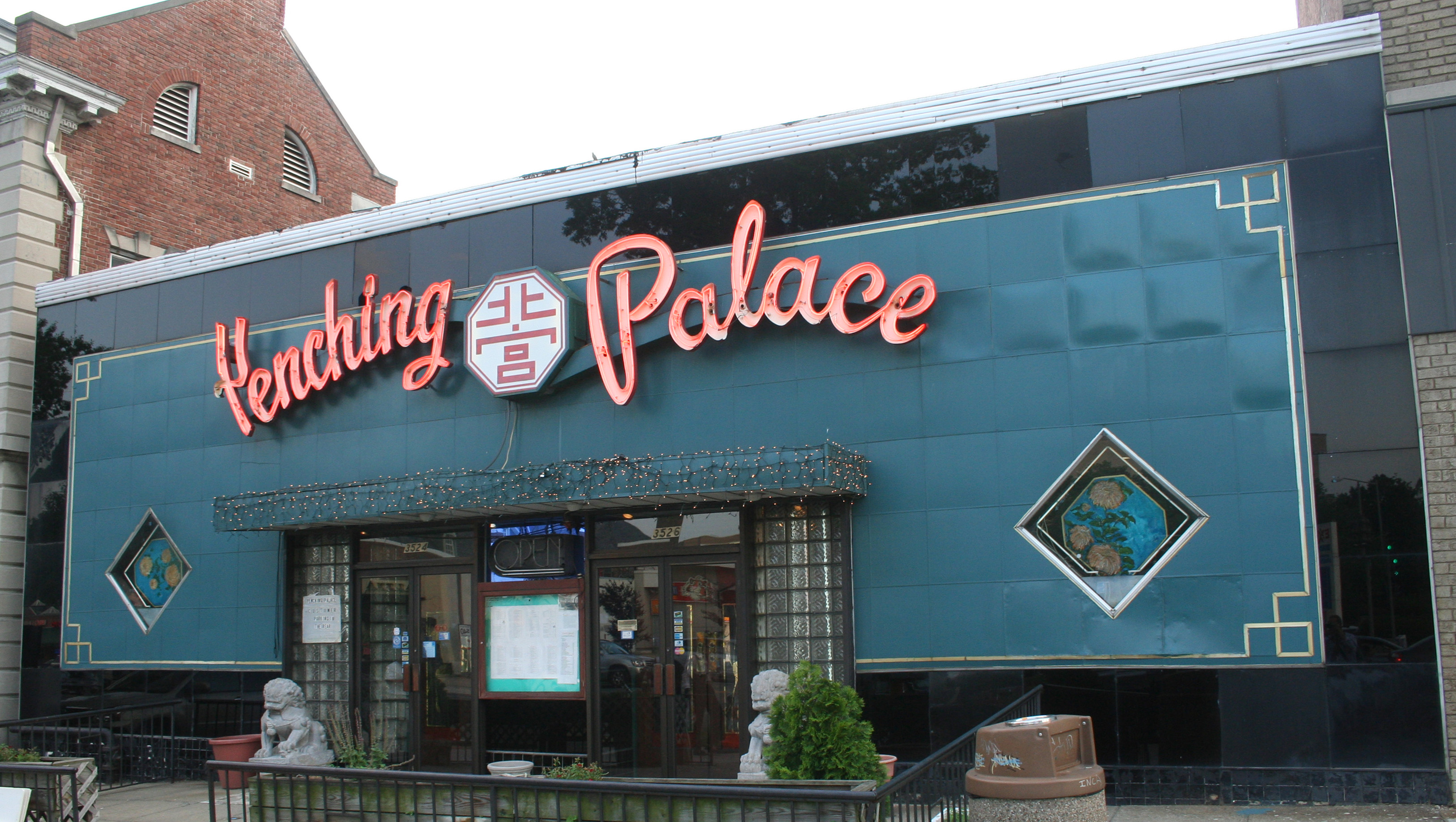
Yenching Palace, Washington, D.C.

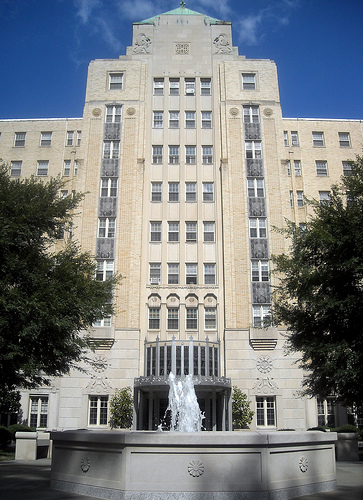
Kennedy–Warren Apartment Building, Washington, D.C.

Building	Location	Date	Reference
1818 New York Avenue NE (former F.P. May Hardware Warehouse)	Washington, D.C.	1946	
6031 Kansas Avenue NE (former F.P. May Hardware Headquarters)	Washington, D.C.	1951	
Adas Israel Congregation	Washington, D.C.	1938	
Arbaugh's (now District Kitchen)	Washington, D.C.	1938	
The Arts of War and The Arts of Peace, Arlington Memorial Bridge	Washington, D.C.	1939	
Atlas Performing Arts Center	Washington, D.C.	1938	
The Bay State	Washington, D.C.	1939	
Brookland Bowling Alleys	Washington, D.C.	1939–1950	
Brownley Confectionary Building	Washington, D.C.	1932	
Bulletin Building	Washington, D.C.	1928	
Central Heating Plant	Washington, D.C.	1933	
Chesapeake and Potomac Telephone Company Building	Washington, D.C.	1928	
Chesapeake and Potomac Telephone Company Warehouse and Repair Facility	Washington, D.C.	1927	
D.C. Armory	Washington, D.C.	1941	
Duke Ellington Bridge	Washington, D.C.	1935	
Fulbright Hall	Washington, D.C.	1939	
Federal Trade Commission Building	Washington, D.C.	1938	
The Field School	Washington, D.C.	1936	
Folger Shakespeare Library	Washington, D.C.	1932	
General Baking Company Bakery	Washington, D.C.		
Glade Apartments–	Washington, D.C.		
Granite State Apartments (now Carlyle Suites Hotel)	Washington, D.C.	1941	
Guglielmo Marconi sculpture	Washington, D.C.	1941	
Harry S. Truman Building	Washington, D.C.	1939	
Hecht Company Warehouse	Washington, D.C.	1937	
Henry J. Daly Building	Washington, D.C.	1941	
Highland Theater	Washington, D.C.	1940	
Jacqueline Bouvier Kennedy Onassis Hall	Washington, D.C.	1938	
Kennedy–Warren Apartment Building	Washington, D.C.	1935	
The Keystone	Washington, D.C.	1931	
Klingle Valley Bridge	Washington, D.C.	1932	
Langston Terrace Dwellings	Washington, D.C.	1935–1938	
Library of Congress John Adams Annex Building	Washington, D.C.	1930	
Lisner Auditorium	Washington, D.C.	1943	
Manhattan Laundry	Washington, D.C.	1936	
Mary E. Switzer Memorial Building	Washington, D.C.	1940	
Munson Hall	Washington, D.C.	1938	
Newton Theater	Washington, D.C.	1937	
Nineteenth Street Baptist Church	Washington, D.C.	1946	
Ogden Gardens and Otis Gardens (now Tivoli Gardens)	Washington, D.C.	1937	
Old Greyhound Terminal	Washington, D.C.	1940	
Omni Shoreham Hotel	Washington, D.C.	1930	
Park Tower	Washington, D.C.	1929	
The Park View	Washington, D.C.	1941	
The Parkhill	Washington, D.C.	1941	
Ronald Reagan Washington National Airport	Washington, D.C.	1941	
Robert F. Kennedy Department of Justice Building	Washington, D.C.	1935	
Sears Roebuck and Company Building (now Best Buy)	Washington, D.C.	1940	
The Shoreham (now Sofitel Washington)	Washington, D.C.	1928	
Texas Gardens Apartments	Washington, D.C.	1940	
Tunlaw Gardens	Washington, D.C.		
Uptown Theater	Washington, D.C.	1936	
US General Accounting Office Building	Washington, D.C.	1949	
Wilbur J. Cohen Federal Building	Washington, D.C.	1939	
Winthrop House	Washington, D.C.	1940	
Wisconsin House	Washington, D.C.	1923	
Woodward & Lothrop Service Warehouse	Washington, D.C.	1939	
Yenching Palace (now Walgreens)	Washington, D.C.	1945	

== West Virginia ==
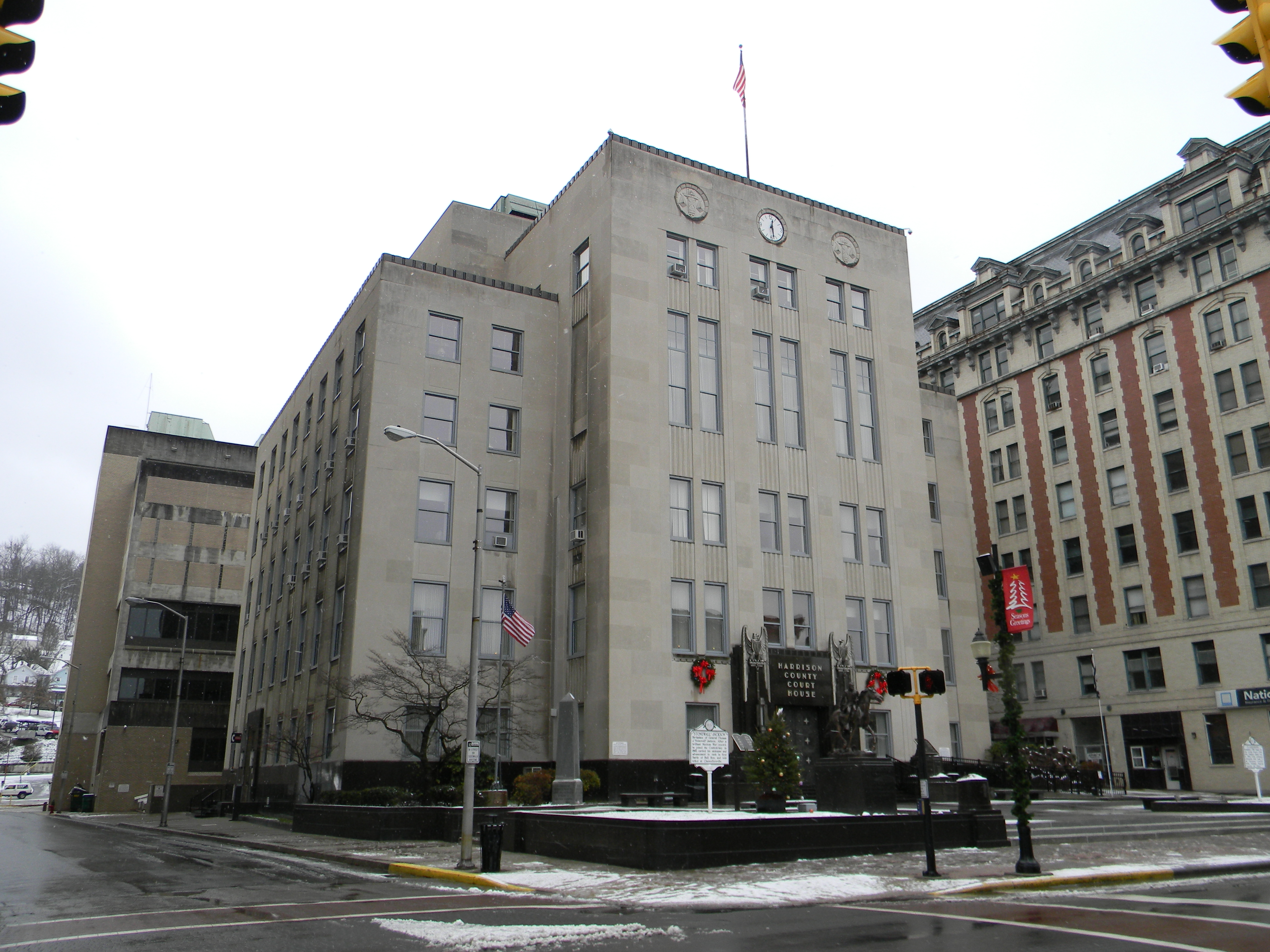
Harrison County Courthouse, Clarksburg, West Virginia

Building	Historic District	Location	Date	Reference
Morgan High School Mechanical Arts Building		Morgan	1936	
Aide's Building	Mount Hope Historic District	Mount Hope	1912, 1930s	
Alderson City Hall	Alderson Historic District	Alderson	1939	
Aldersons Store		Alderson	1930s	
Algoma Coal and Coke Company Store		Algoma	1948	
Appalachian Electric Power Building		Williamson	1940s	
Atlas Building		Charleston	1930s	
Charleston Municipal Auditorium		Charleston	1939	
Citizens Bank of Weston	Weston Downtown Historic District	Weston	1930	
Colonial Theatre	Bluefield Downtown Commercial Historic District	Bluefield	1916, 1945	
Citizens Building		Morgantown	1921–1922	
Croft-Stanard Building (now Mountain State Centers for Independent Living)		Huntington		
Feuchtenberger Bakery		Bluefield	1940s	
Fourth Ward School		Morgantown	1910, 1939	
Grand Theater	Ronceverte Historic District	Ronceverte	1937	
Greyhound Bus Depot		Huntington		
Harrison County Courthouse		Clarksburg	1931–1932	
JC Penney Catalog Store	Downtown Richwood Historic District	Richwood	1925	
Marland Heights Park and Margaret Manson Weir Memorial Pool		Weirton	1934	
Mercer County Courthouse		Princeton	1931	
Mount Hope Theatre	Mount Hope Historic District	Mount Hope	1920	
Mountaineer Casino, Racetrack, and Resort		New Cumberland	1951	
New Star Theatre	Downtown Richwood Historic District	Richwood	1926	
Nicholas County Courthouse		Summersville	1898, 1940	
Old GC Murphy Building	Downtown Richwood Historic District	Richwood	1921	
Ohio County Board of Education		Wheeling	1920s or 1930s	
Peerless Coal Company Store		Vivian	1921	
Prince Station		Prince	1942	
Richwood Chamber of Commerce	Downtown Richwood Historic District	Richwood	1925	
Riverview Terrace		Charleston	1937	
Roxy Theater	Clendenin Historic District	Clendenin	1930s	
Second Ward Negro Elementary School		Morgantown	1939	
Smoot Theater interior		Parkersburg	1926	
State Theatre		Charleston	1939	
Stone & Thomas		Charleston	1948	
Trivillian's Pharmacy and Soda Fountain		Charleston	1950	
Tygart Dam		Taylor County	1938	
Verizon Building		Clarksburg	1948	
Warner Theatre		Morgantown	1931	
Whitesville School		Whitesville	1931	
Wristin Building		Huntington	1920	
Wyoming Hotel		Mullens	1920	

== Wisconsin ==
Johnson Wax Headquarters, Racine, Wisconsin

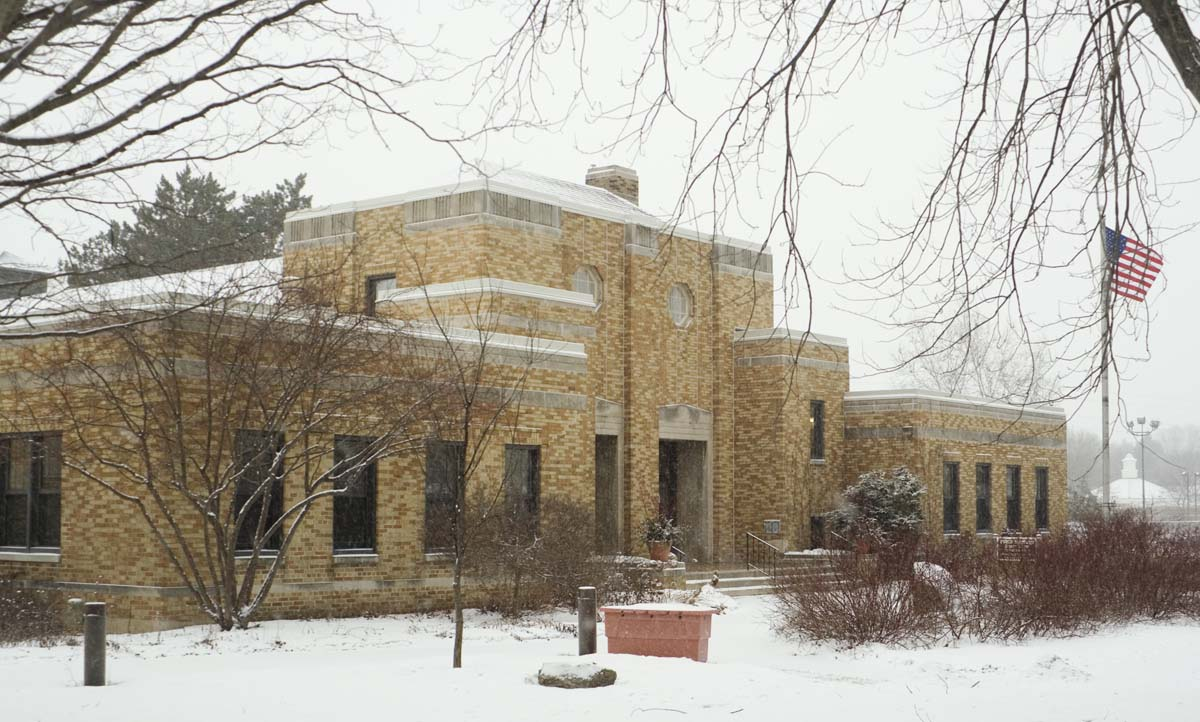
Mequon Town Hall and Fire Station Complex, Mequon, Wisconsin

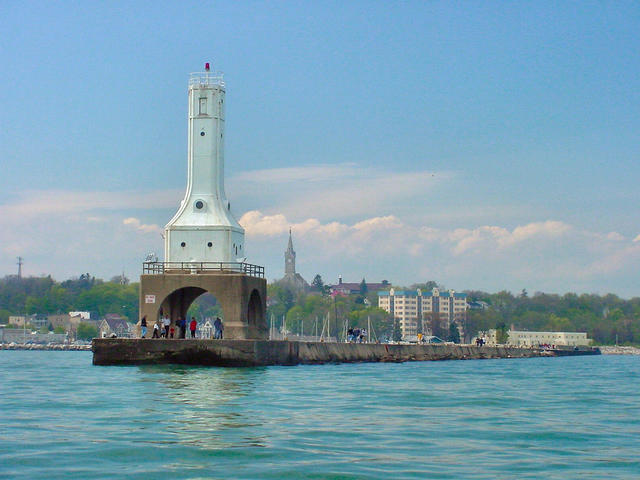
Port Washington Breakwater Light, Port Washington, Wisconsin

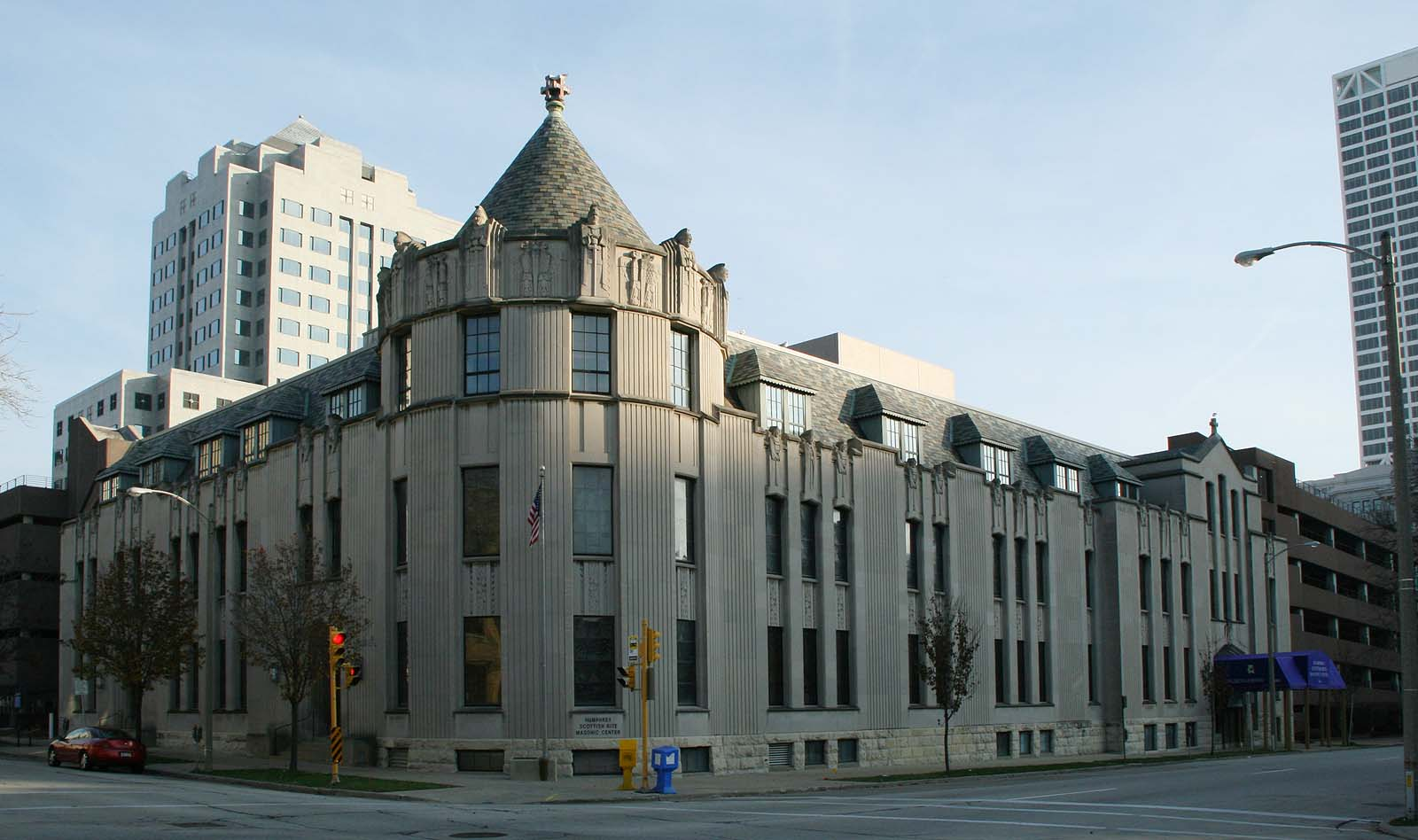
Wisconsin Consistory Building, Milwaukee, Wisconsin

Building	Historic District	Location	Date	Reference
A. D. German Warehouse		Richland Center	1921	
Ambassador Hotel		Milwaukee	1928	
Arnason Apartment Building		Shorewood	1930	
Ashland Jewelers		Ashland	1930s	
Bay Theatre	West Second Street Historic District	Ashland	1937	
Berlin City Hall	Huron Street Historic District	Berlin	1928	
Berlin Post Office		Berlin	1936	
Blaine Theatre		Boscobel	1934	
Bradford Beach Bathhouse		Milwaukee	1950	
City Bank of Portage	Portage Retail Historic District	Portage	1929	
Columbus Post Office		Columbus	1939	
Commonwealth Telephone Company	Iowa Street Historic District	Dodgeville	1940	
Crawford Building		Superior	1928	
E. L. Chester Department Store		Beloit	1936	
Exchange Building		La Crosse	1940	
First National Bank		Ripon	1930	
Florence Town Hall		Florence	1937	
Forest Products Laboratory		Madison	1932	
Franklin School		Rice Lake	1936	
George Draeb Jewelry Store		Sturgeon Bay	1935	
Gibson Building	College Avenue Historic District	Appleton		
Goetz Theatre, Monroe Commercial District		Monroe	1931	
Grand Warner Theatre		Milwaukee	1931	
Green Lake Village Hall		Green Lake	1939	
Hilton Milwaukee City Center		Milwaukee	1927	
Johnson Wax Headquarters		Racine	1939	
Kaiser's		Racine	1928	
King on 5th Building		La Crosse	1946	
Krambo Supermarket		Green Bay	1940s	
Lancaster Post Office		Lancaster	1938	
Lidice Memorial		Phillips	1942	
Marinette County Courthouse		Marinette	1941	
Mequon Town Hall and Fire Station Complex		Mequon	1937	
Meyer Theatre		Green Bay	1929	
Milwaukee Western Fuel Co. Building		Milwaukee	1934	
Neillsville Masonic Temple Lodge No, 163		Neillsville	1928	
New Glarus Public School and High School Gymnasium		New Glarus	1890s	
Port Washington Breakwater Light		Port Washington	1935	
Prairie du Chien Post Office		Prairie du Chien	1938	
Quisling Terrace Apartments		Madison	1946	
Racine County Courthouse		Racine	1931	
Sarge Boyd Bandshell		Eau Claire	1938	
Schwartz Manufacturing Company		Two Rivers	1940	
Sheboygan County Courthouse		Sheboygan	1933	
Southport Beach House		Kenosha	1940	
State Office Building		Madison	1931	
State Theatre		Eau Claire	1926	
Strong Building		Beloit	1923	
Sturgeon Bay City Hall addition	Third Avenue Historic District	Sturgeon Bay	1935	
Tenney Building		Madison	1930	
The Vogue	West Second Street Historic District	Ashland	1930–1937	
Union National Bank		Eau Claire	1930	
West Theater	Broadway-Walnut Historic District	Green Bay	1943	
Wisconsin Consistory Building		Milwaukee	1893	
Wisconsin Gas Building		Milwaukee	1930	
Wisconsin Tower		Milwaukee	1929	
Zivko's Ballroom		Hartford	1928	

== Wyoming ==
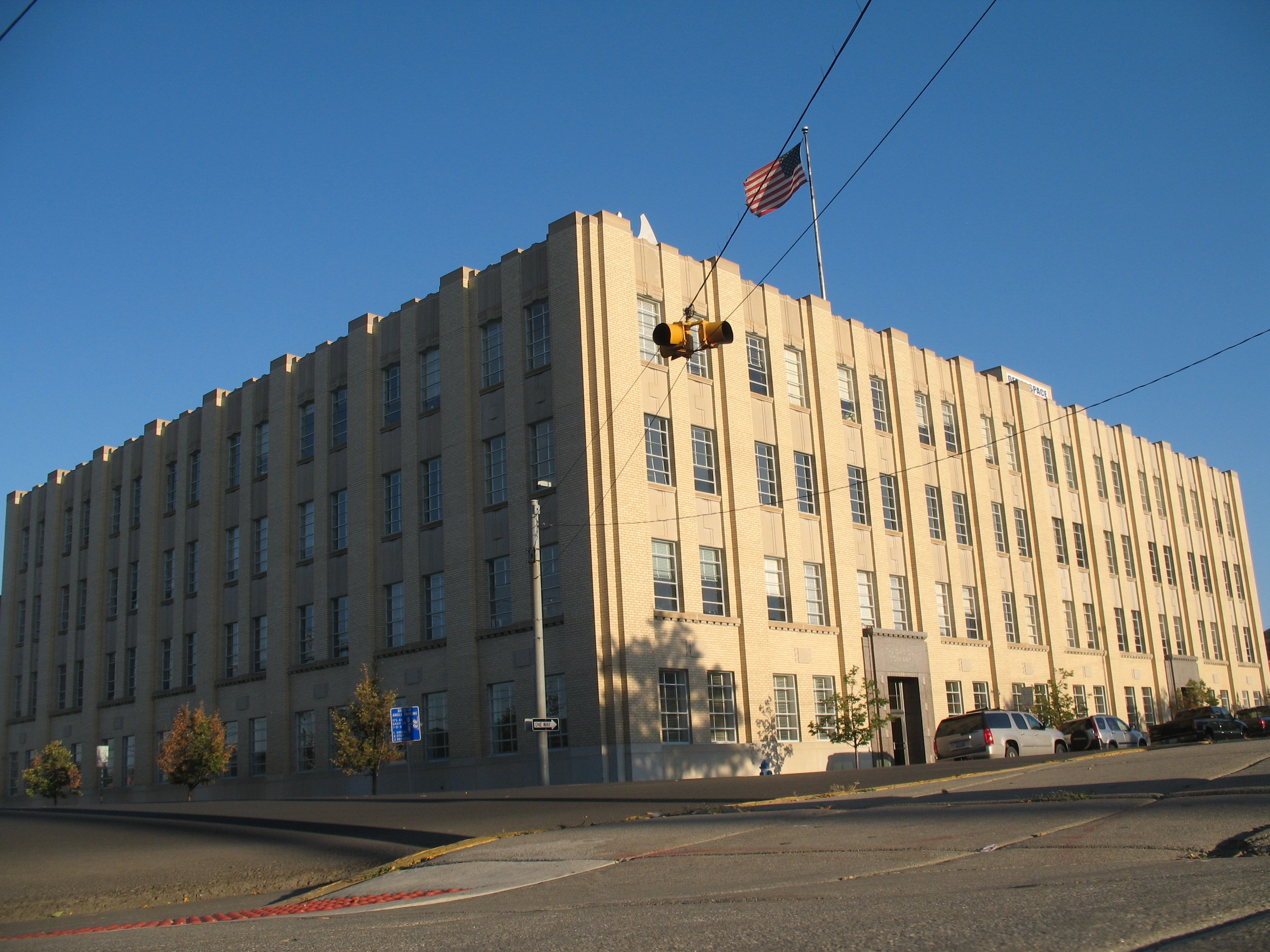
Ohio Oil Company Building, Casper, Wyoming

Building	Historic District	Location	Date	Reference
Bandshell, Washington Park		Laramie	1940	
Bandshell, Whipple Park		Lingle	1942	
Big Horn Academy Gymnasium		Cowley	1936	
Boeing/United Airlines Terminal Building, Hangar, and Fountain		Cheyenne	1929–1934	
Carbon County Courthouse		Rawlins	1940	
City Hall		Cody	1939	
City Hall		Laramie	1938	
City Hall (former United States Post Office)		Wheatland	1936	
Cody Theatre		Cody	1937	
Deming Elementary School		Cheyenne	1945	
Elks Lodge		Cody	1940s	
Fanelli Sleep Shop		Rock Springs	1903, 1930s	
Gillette City Hall		Gillette	1936	
High School		Greybull	1938	
Hot Springs County Courthouse		Thermopolis	1938	
Hyart Theater		Lovell	1950	
Junior High School		Lander	1938	
Lincoln $ SAVER (former Lincoln Theatre)		Cheyenne	1927	
Lingle Elementary School		Lingle	1939	
Mabel Fincher School		Cheyenne	1940	
Natrona County Courthouse		Casper	1940	
Odd Fellows Building		Casper	1952	
Ohio Oil Company Building		Casper	1949	
Rawlins Police Department (former City Hall)		Rawlins	1940	
Sather's Jewelry	Downtown Evanston Historic District	Evanston		
State Bank of Wheatland		Wheatland	1934	
United States Post Office		Greybull	1938	
United States Post Office		Torrington	1932	
University of Wyoming Arts and Sciences Auditorium		Laramie	1936	
University of Wyoming Engineering Hall		Laramie	1940	
University of Wyoming Liberal Arts Building		Laramie		
University of Wyoming Wyoming Union Building		Laramie	1937	
Vocational School		Greybull		
Wakashie County Courthouse		Worland	1937	
Wyo Theater		Laramie	1925	

== See also ==
- List of Art Deco architecture
- List of New Deal sculpture
