= List of NCAA Division I men's basketball tournament venues =

List of NCAA Division

The following is a list of venues that have hosted the NCAA Division I men's basketball tournament. Venues that have not yet hosted, but have been officially announced as future tournament sites, are also included. (Note that in most cases, the modern name of the venue is used, though it may have been known under a different name at the time.)

== First Four ==
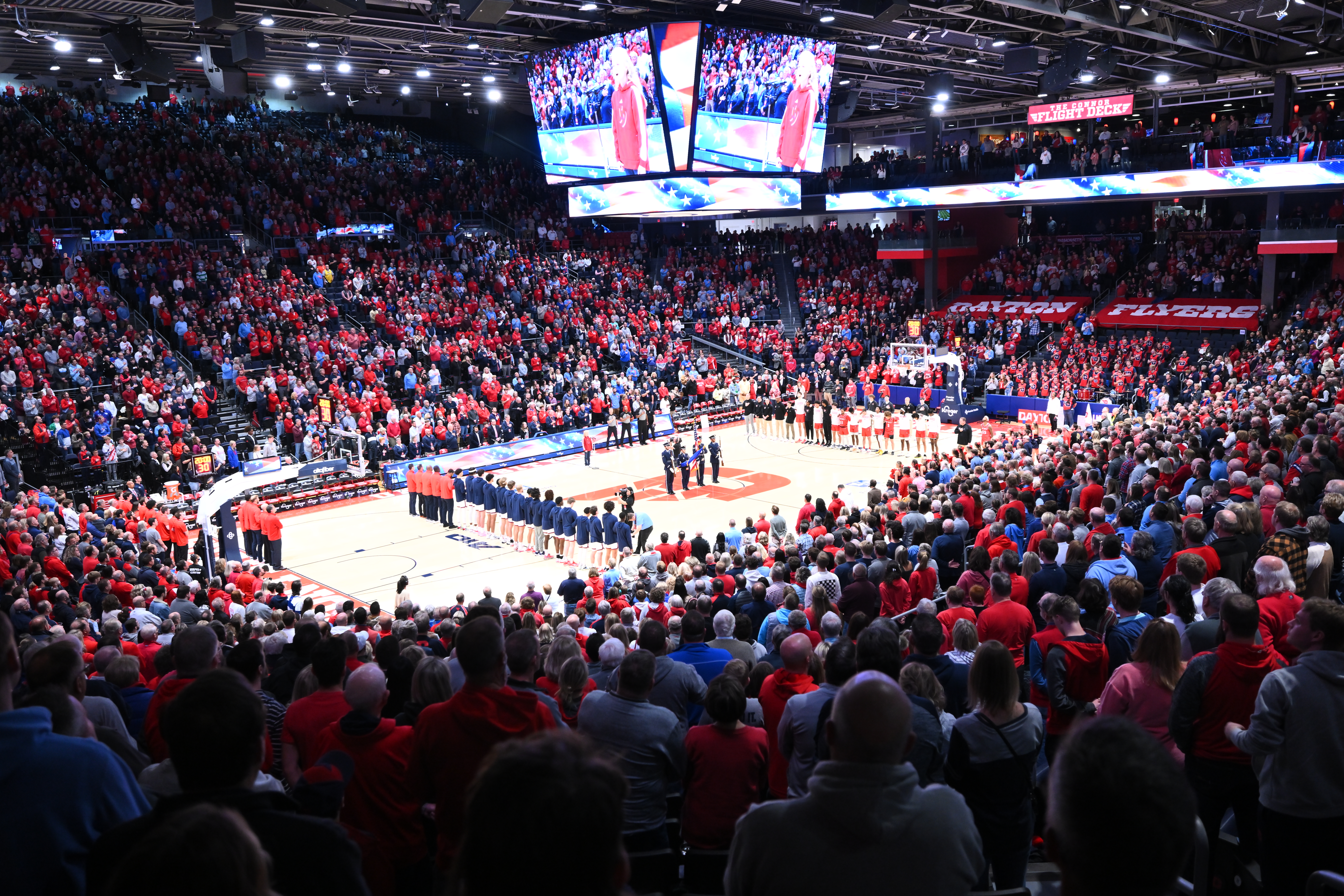
University of Dayton Arena, in Dayton, Ohio, has hosted more tournament games than any other venue (131 as of 2023).

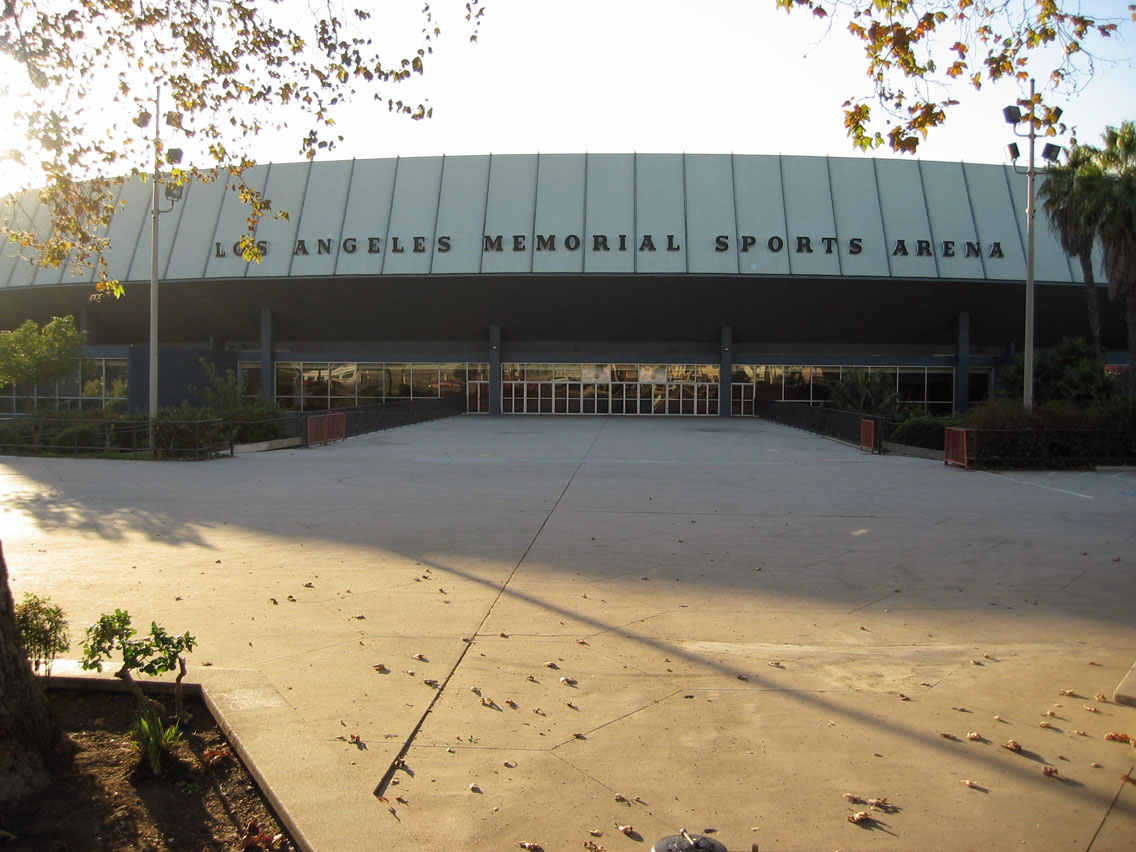
Los Angeles Sports Arena

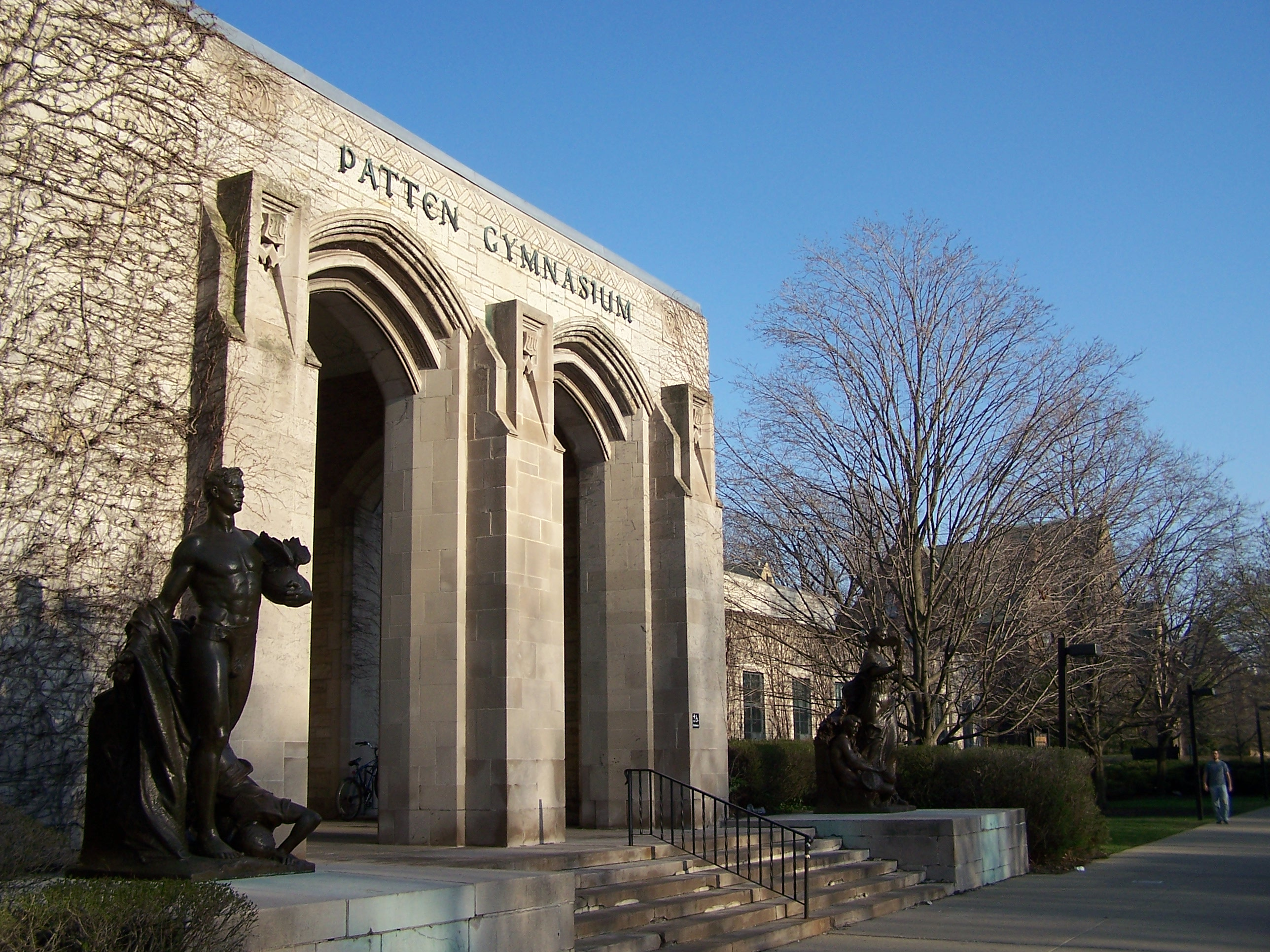
Patten Gymnasium, in Evanston, Illinois, hosted the first championship game in 1939.

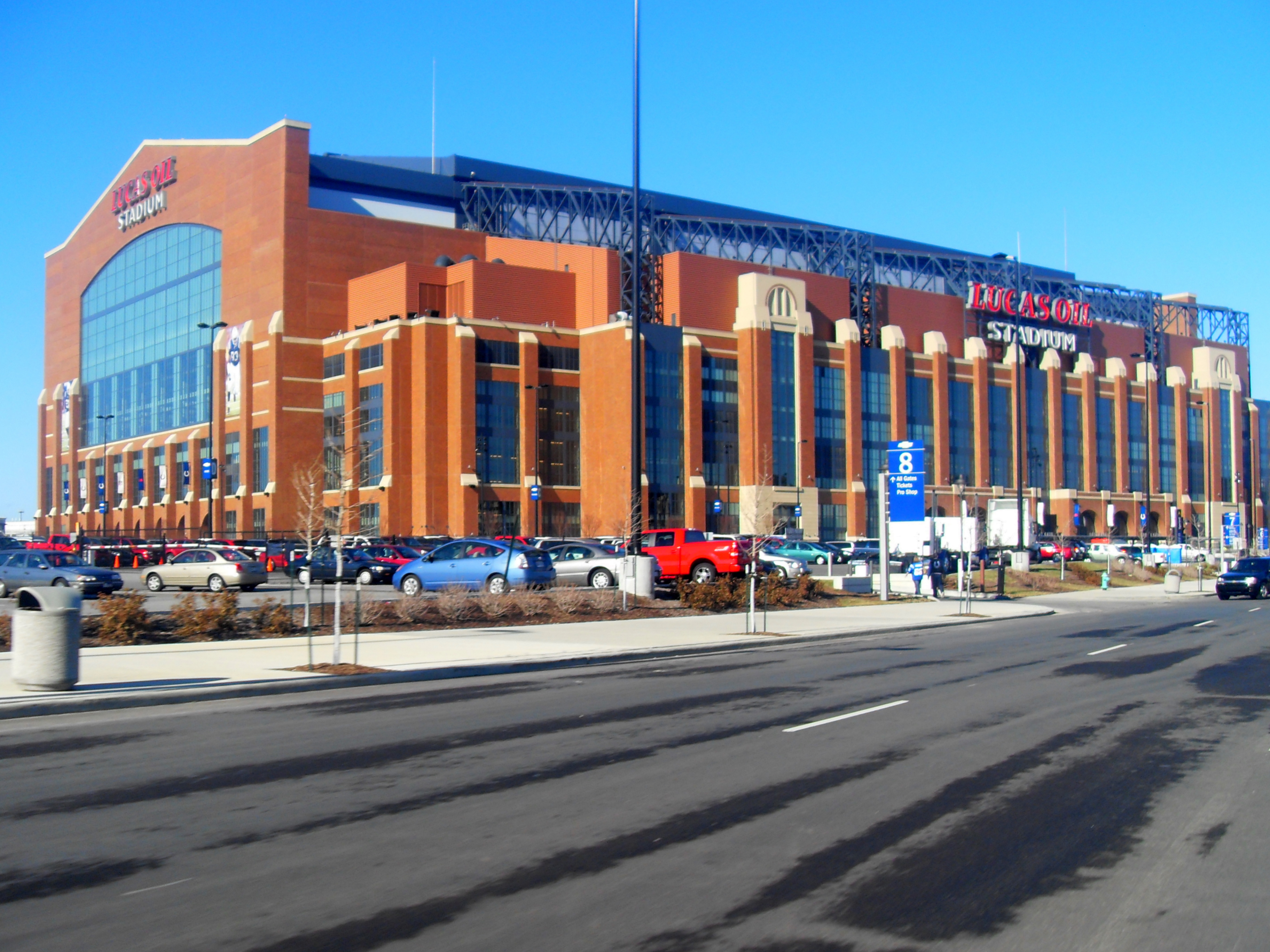
Lucas Oil Stadium in Indianapolis

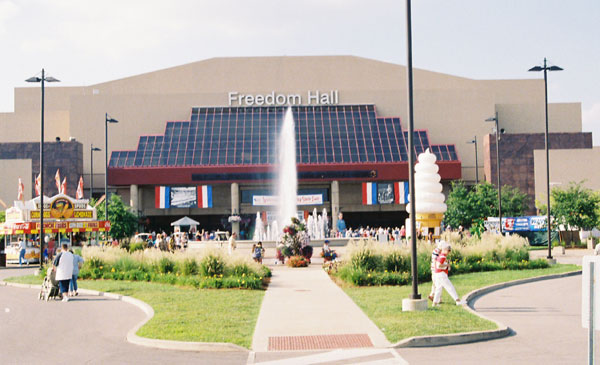
Freedom Hall in Louisville

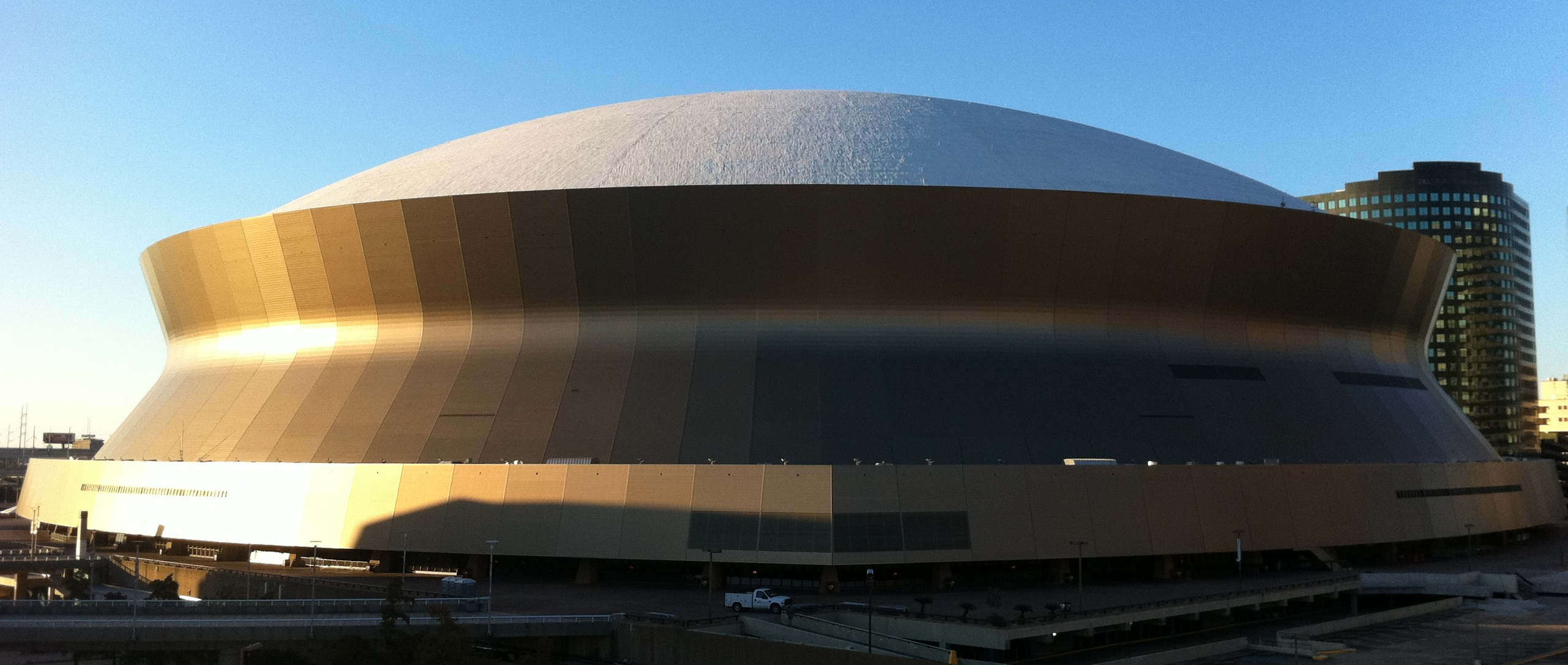
Six Final Fours have been at New Orleans' Caesars Superdome.

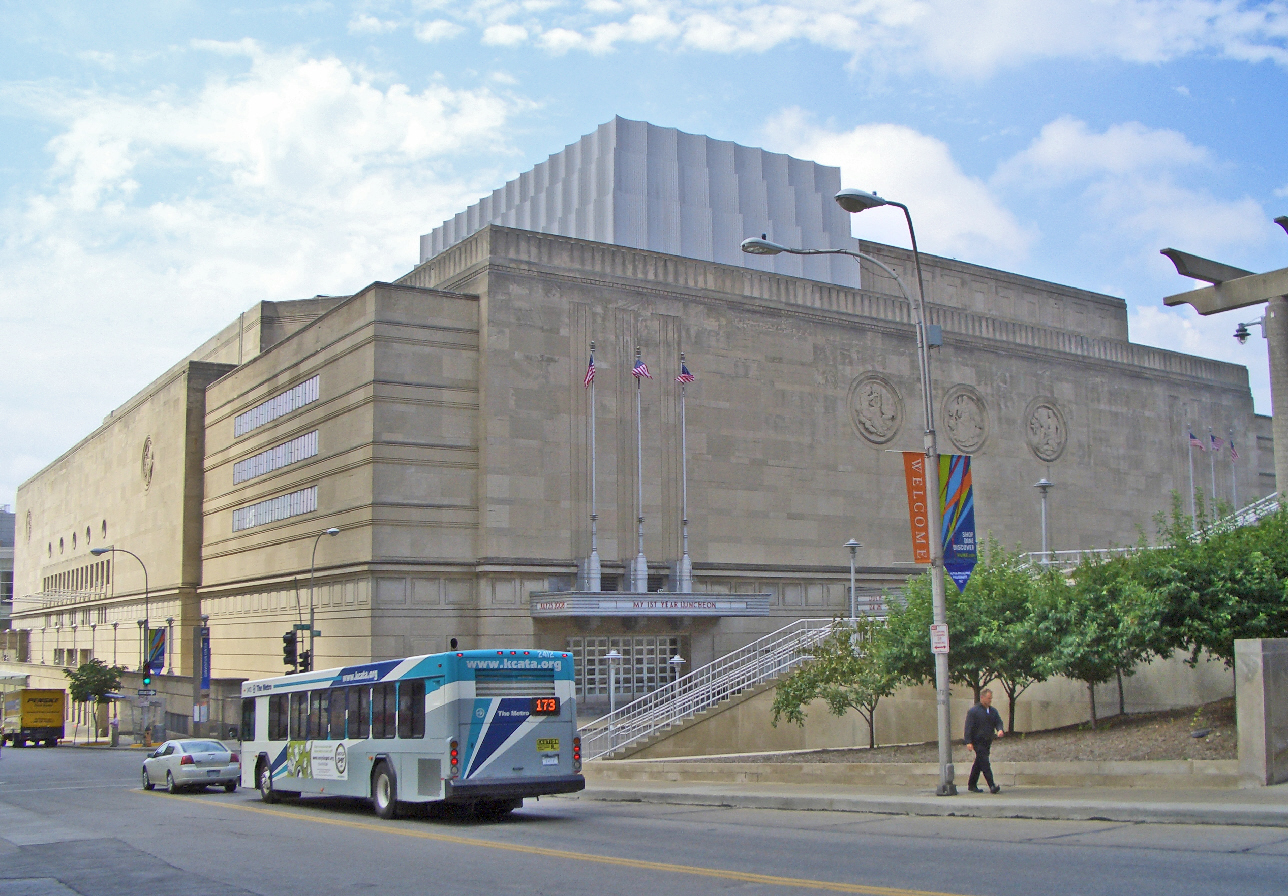
The Municipal Auditorium in Kansas City, Missouri has hosted nine Final Fours, the most as of 2019.

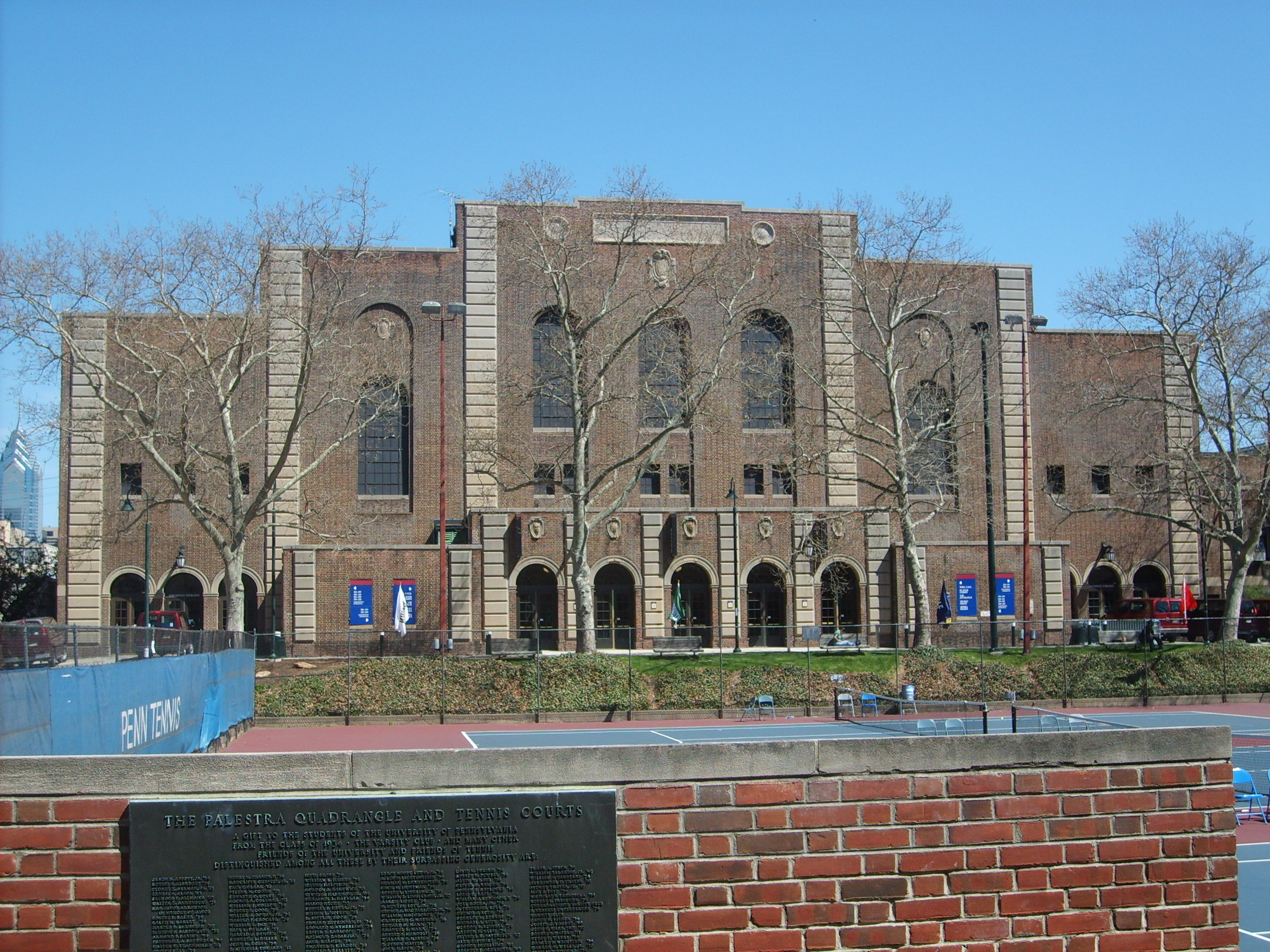
The Palestra in Philadelphia

While the First Four format began in 2011, the tournament previously featured an Opening Round with "play-in games" in twelve editions. In 1983, there were four games in the Opening Round with two games in Philadelphia and two games in Dayton. In 1984, there were five games in the Opening Round with three games in Philadelphia and two games in Dayton. Like today's First Four, these games were a partial seventh round for the tournament with the winners advanced to the First Round proper.

From 1985 to 2000 there were 64 teams in the tournament and no play-in games. In order to grant the recently formed Mountain West Conference an automatic bid, the NCAA decided in 2001 to add one team to the field rather than reduce the number of at-large bids.

City	State	Arena	First Four	No.
Bloomington	IN	Simon Skjodt Assembly Hall	2021 (Note: Due to COVID-19 precautions, the 2021 tournament did not use the traditional division of rounds for sites: Mackey Arena and Simon Skjodt Assembly Hall hosted First Four and First Round games.; Indiana Farmers Coliseum hosted First and Second Round games.; Gainbridge Fieldhouse and Hinkle Fieldhouse hosted First and Second Round games as well as Regional Semifinals.; Lucas Oil Stadium, with two adjacent courts, hosted First and Second Round games, all Regional Finals, and the Final Four.)	1
West Lafayette	IN	Mackey Arena	2021	1
Dayton	OH	UD Arena	1983, 1984, 2001–2019, 2022–2026, 2027, 2028	25
Philadelphia	PA	The Palestra	1983, 1984	2

== First and Second Rounds ==
This list includes sites which hosted preliminary games equivalent to the current First and Second Rounds. The 1951 tournament was the first tournament to have a game at a site other than the regional or national championship sites. From 1953 through 1974, the tournament had between three and six sites host first round games, with the winners progressing to the regional semifinals at the regional sites. In 1975, the tournament expanded to 32 teams and eliminated byes for top seeds, to accommodate the additional games eight sites hosted first round games. Between 1979 and 1985, the tournament gradually expanded to a 64-team field with a full, sixth round, creating the modern First and Second Rounds hosted at eight sites.

City	State	Arena	First and Second Rounds	No.
Birmingham	AL	Legacy Arena	1984, 1987, 2000, 2003, 2008, 2023, 2028	6
Tuscaloosa	AL	Coleman Coliseum	1975, 1981	3
Tempe	AZ	Desert Financial Arena	1975, 1976, 1978, 1980, 1992, 1996	6
Tucson	AZ	McKale Center	1977, 1979, 1987, 1989, 1991, 1993, 1997, 2000, 2005, 2011	10
Little Rock (North Little Rock)	AR	Simmons Bank Arena	2008	1
Anaheim	CA	Honda Center	2008	1
Berkeley	CA	Haas Pavilion	1958	1
Daly City	CA	Cow Palace	1955	1
Long Beach	CA	Long Beach Arena	1986, 1990	2
Los Angeles	CA	Pauley Pavilion	1979, 1981, 1988	3
Palo Alto	CA	Burnham Pavilion	1953	1
Sacramento	CA	ARCO Arena	1994, 1998, 2002, 2007	4
Sacramento	CA	Golden 1 Center	2017, 2023, 2027	2
San Diego	CA	Viejas Arena	2001, 2006, 2014, 2018, 2022, 2026	5
San Jose	CA	SAP Center	2010, 2013, 2019	3
Denver	CO	McNichols Sports Arena	1999	1
Denver	CO	Ball Arena	2004, 2008, 2011, 2016, 2023, 2025	6
Fort Collins	CO	Moby Arena	1967	1
Hartford	CT	PeoplesBank Arena	1983, 1985, 1988, 1990, 1998, 2019	6
Washington	DC	Capital One Arena	1998, 2002, 2008, 2011	4
Jacksonville	FL	VyStar Veterans Memorial Arena	2006, 2010, 2015, 2019	4
Miami	FL	Kaseya Center	2009	1
Orlando	FL	Amway Arena	1993, 1996, 1999, 2004	4
Orlando	FL	Kia Center	2014, 2017, 2023, 2028	3
St. Petersburg	FL	Tropicana Field	1994	1
Tallahassee	FL	Donald L. Tucker Civic Center	1995	1
Tampa	FL	Yuengling Center	1983	1
Tampa	FL	Benchmark International Arena	2003, 2008, 2011, 2026	3
Atlanta	GA	Omni Coliseum	1985, 1987, 1988, 1989, 1990, 1991, 1992	7
Atlanta	GA	Georgia Dome	1998	1
Boise	ID	ExtraMile Arena	1983, 1989, 1992, 1995, 1998, 2001, 2005, 2009, 2018	9
Pocatello	ID	Reed Gym	1957	1
Pocatello	ID	ICCU Dome	1972, 1974, 1977	3
Carbondale	IL	Banterra Center	1969	1
Chicago	IL	Alumni Hall	1960	1
Chicago	IL	United Center	1998, 2002, 2007, 2011	4
Evanston	IL	Welsh–Ryan Arena	1958, 1963, 1964	3
Peoria	IL	Robertson Memorial Field House	1954	1
Rosemont	IL	Allstate Arena	1987, 1993	2
Bloomington	IN	Simon Skjodt Assembly Hall	1977, 1979, 2021	3
Evansville	IN	Roberts Municipal Stadium	1983	1
Fort Wayne	IN	Allen County War Memorial Coliseum	1953, 1954, 1956	3
Indianapolis	IN	Hinkle Fieldhouse	2021	1
Indianapolis	IN	Market Square Arena	1978, 1982	2
Indianapolis	IN	Corteva Coliseum	2021	1
Indianapolis	IN	RCA Dome	1987, 1989, 1990, 1993, 1996, 1999, 2003, 2005	8
Indianapolis	IN	Gainbridge Fieldhouse	2017, 2021, 2022, 2024	4
Indianapolis	IN	Lucas Oil Stadium	2021	1
South Bend	IN	Joyce Center	1971, 1976, 1985, 1988	4
Terre Haute	IN	Hulman Center	1974	1
West Lafayette	IN	Mackey Arena	1980, 2021	2
Des Moines	IA	Wells Fargo Arena	2016, 2019, 2023, 2028	3
Lawrence	KS	Allen Fieldhouse	1976, 1979	2
Wichita	KS	Charles Koch Arena	1956, 1966, 1973, 1978, 1981	5
Wichita (Park City)	KS	Kansas Coliseum	1994	1
Wichita	KS	Intrust Bank Arena	2018, 2025	2
Bowling Green	KY	E. A. Diddle Arena	1965, 1980	2
Lexington	KY	Memorial Coliseum	1955, 1959, 1960, 1962, 1967, 1975	6
Lexington	KY	Rupp Arena	1994, 1998, 2007, 2013, 2025	5
Louisville	KY	Freedom Hall	1961, 1983, 1991	3
Louisville	KY	KFC Yum! Center	2012, 2015, 2027	2
Baton Rouge	LA	Pete Maravich Assembly Center	1977, 1986	2
New Orleans	LA	Caesars Superdome	1999, 2001	2
New Orleans	LA	Smoothie King Center	2007, 2010	2
Baltimore	MD	CFG Bank Arena	1995	1
College Park	MD	Jones-Hill House	1968, 1991	2
Landover	MD	Capital Centre	1994	1
Boston	MA	TD Garden	1999, 2003	2
Worcester	MA	DCU Center	1992, 2005	2
Auburn Hills	MI	The Palace of Auburn Hills	1997, 2006, 2013	3
Detroit	MI	Little Caesars Arena	2018	1
Minneapolis	MN	Hubert H. Humphrey Metrodome	1986, 1991, 2000, 2009	4
Minneapolis	MN	Target Center	2027	0
Kansas City	MO	Kemper Arena	1997, 2001, 2004	3
Kansas City	MO	Municipal Auditorium	1951 (Note: The initial round of the 1951 tournament is considered the First Round despite being a round of 16 teams. The tournament expanded in 1951 to 16 teams but retained the two-region structure with the two regional champions meeting for the national championship game at a separate site. The NCAA's 1951 bracket names the round of 16 as the First Round, the round of 8 as the Regional Semifinals, and the round of 4 as the Regional Finals. All games of the West Region were played in Kansas City. In the East Region, two games in the initial round were played in Raleigh and the remainder of the games were played in New York City.)	1
Kansas City	MO	T-Mobile Center	2009, 2013	2
St. Louis	MO	Enterprise Center	2014, 2016, 2026	2
St. Louis	MO	The Dome at America's Center	2002	1
Lincoln	NE	Bob Devaney Sports Center	1980, 1984, 1988	3
Omaha	NE	Omaha Civic Auditorium	1977	1
Omaha	NE	CHI Health Center Omaha	2008, 2012, 2015, 2024, 2027	4
East Rutherford	NJ	Meadowlands Arena	1984	1
Princeton	NJ	Jadwin Gymnasium	1970, 1972	2
Albuquerque	NM	The Pit	1985, 1996, 2002, 2012	4
Las Cruces	NM	Las Cruces High School Gymnasium	1959	1
Las Cruces	NM	Pan American Center	1969, 1972	2
Albany	NY	MVP Arena	1995, 2023	2
Buffalo	NY	Buffalo Memorial Auditorium	1954	1
Buffalo	NY	KeyBank Center	2000, 2004, 2007, 2010, 2014, 2017, 2022, 2026	7
New York City (Jamaica)	NY	Carnesecca Arena	1970, 1971, 1972, 1973, 1974	5
New York City (Manhattan)	NY	Madison Square Garden (1925)	1951, 1955, 1956, 1957, 1958, 1959, 1960, 1961	8
New York City (Brooklyn)	NY	Barclays Center	2016, 2024, 2028	2
Syracuse	NY	JMA Wireless Dome	1986, 1987, 1991, 1993	4
Uniondale	NY	Nassau Coliseum	1982, 1994, 2001	3
Chapel Hill	NC	Dean Smith Center	1988	1
Charlotte	NC	Bojangles Coliseum	1975, 1976, 1978, 1981, 1982, 1984, 1986, 1987	8
Charlotte	NC	Charlotte Coliseum	1997, 1999, 2005	3
Charlotte	NC	Spectrum Center	2011, 2015, 2018, 2024, 2027	4
Durham	NC	Cameron Indoor Stadium	1954	1
Greensboro	NC	First Horizon Coliseum	1980, 1983, 1986, 1989, 1992, 2001, 2006, 2009, 2012, 2023	10
Raleigh	NC	Reynolds Coliseum	1951, 1969, 1977, 1979	4
Raleigh	NC	Lenovo Center	2004, 2008, 2014, 2016, 2025	5
Winston-Salem	NC	Lawrence Joel Veterans Memorial Coliseum	1993, 1997, 2000, 2007	4
Cincinnati	OH	Heritage Bank Center	1988, 1992	2
Cleveland	OH	Wolstein Center	2000, 2005	2
Cleveland	OH	Rocket Arena	2011, 2025	2
Columbus	OH	St. John Arena	1957	1
Columbus	OH	Nationwide Arena	2004, 2007, 2012, 2015, 2019, 2023, 2028	6
Dayton	OH	UD Arena	1970, 1973, 1976, 1981, 1985, 1986, 1991, 1992, 1995, 2001, 2006, 2009, 2013	13
Kent	OH	Memorial Athletic and Convocation Center	1966, 1968	2
El Reno	OK	Thunderbird Coliseum	1955	1
Norman	OK	Lloyd Noble Center	1977	1
Oklahoma City	OK	Capitol Hill High School Arena	1957	1
Oklahoma City	OK	The Myriad	1994, 1998	2
Oklahoma City	OK	Paycom Center	2003, 2005, 2010, 2016, 2026	4
Stillwater	OK	Gallagher-Iba Arena	1958	1
Tulsa	OK	Mabee Center	1975, 1978, 1982, 1985	4
Tulsa	OK	BOK Center	2011, 2017, 2019, 2028	3
Corvallis	OR	Gill Coliseum	1960, 1962, 1983	3
Eugene	OR	McArthur Court	1963, 1964, 1978	3
Portland	OR	Portland Expo Center	1959	1
Portland	OR	Memorial Coliseum	1961, 1975	2
Portland	OR	Moda Center	2009, 2012, 2015, 2022, 2026	4
Philadelphia	PA	The Palestra	1953, 1962, 1963, 1964, 1965, 1970, 1971, 1973, 1974, 1975, 1977, 1978	12
Philadelphia	PA	Wells Fargo Center	2006, 2009, 2013, 2026	3
Pittsburgh	PA	Civic Arena	1997, 2002	2
Pittsburgh	PA	PPG Paints Arena	2012, 2015, 2018, 2022, 2024, 2027	5
Kingston	RI	Keaney Gymnasium	1967, 1968, 1969	3
Providence	RI	Amica Mutual Pavilion	1975, 1976, 1979, 1980, 1981, 1989, 1996, 2010, 2016, 2025	10
Columbia	SC	Colonial Life Arena	2019	1
Greenville	SC	Bon Secours Wellness Arena	2002, 2017, 2022, 2026	3
Knoxville	TN	Stokely Athletic Center	1972, 1978	2
Knoxville	TN	Thompson–Boling Arena	1990	1
Memphis	TN	Mid-South Coliseum	1984	1
Memphis	TN	Pyramid	1995, 1997, 2001	3
Memphis	TN	FedExForum	2024	1
Murfreesboro	TN	Murphy Center	1979	1
Nashville	TN	Memorial Gym	1982, 1989, 1993	3
Nashville	TN	Bridgestone Arena	2000, 2003, 2005, 2012, 2018	5
Austin	TX	Frank Erwin Center	1981, 1990, 1995, 2013	4
Dallas	TX	Moody Coliseum	1962, 1964, 1979	3
Dallas	TX	Reunion Arena	1982, 1989, 1996	3
Dallas	TX	American Airlines Center	2002, 2006, 2018	3
Denton	TX	UNT Coliseum	1974, 1976, 1980	3
El Paso	TX	Don Haskins Center	1981	1
Fort Worth	TX	Schollmaier Arena	1969, 1970	2
Fort Worth	TX	Dickies Arena	2022, 2027	1
Houston	TX	Delmar Fieldhouse	1961	1
Houston	TX	Fertitta Center	1971, 1985	2
Houston	TX	The Summit	1983	1
Lubbock	TX	Lubbock Municipal Coliseum	1963, 1965, 1975	3
San Antonio	TX	Frost Bank Center	2014	1
Logan	UT	Smith Spectrum	1971, 1973, 1982	3
Ogden	UT	Dee Events Center	1980, 1986, 1994	3
Provo	UT	Smith Fieldhouse	1960, 1970	2
Salt Lake City	UT	Nielsen Fieldhouse	1968	1
Salt Lake City	UT	Jon M. Huntsman Center	1984, 1985, 1987, 1988, 1990, 1991, 1993, 1995, 1997, 2000, 2003, 2006	12
Salt Lake City	UT	Delta Center	2013, 2017, 2019, 2024, 2028	4
Blacksburg	VA	Cassell Coliseum	1966, 1967	2
Richmond	VA	Richmond Coliseum	1990, 1996	2
Williamsburg	VA	Kaplan Arena	1972, 1973	2
Pullman	WA	Beasley Coliseum	1975, 1982, 1984	3
Seattle	WA	Hec Edmundson Pavilion	1953, 1956	2
Seattle	WA	Climate Pledge Arena	1999, 2004, 2015, 2025, 2028	4
Spokane	WA	Numerica Veterans Arena	2003, 2007, 2010, 2014, 2016, 2024, 2027	6
Morgantown	WV	WVU Coliseum	1971, 1974	2
Milwaukee	WI	UW–Milwaukee Panther Arena	1984	1
Milwaukee	WI	Bradley Center	1992, 1996, 1999, 2004, 2010, 2014, 2017	7
Milwaukee	WI	Fiserv Forum	2022, 2025	2

== Regionals ==
Between 1939 and 1951, the Regional Championships were the National Semifinals, with the winners advancing to a separate site. From 1952 to the present, the Regional Championships are the national quarterfinals with the winners advancing to the Final Four. In most editions of the tournament these sites have been given a geographic designation such as "East Region".

City	State	Arena	Regionals	No.
Birmingham	AL	Legacy Arena	1982, 1985, 1988, 1995, 1997	5
Tuscaloosa	AL	Memorial Coliseum	1974	1
Glendale	AZ	State Farm Stadium	2009	1
Phoenix	AZ	US Airways Center	1999, 2004, 2008, 2012	4
Tucson	AZ	McKale Center	1974, 1980	2
Anaheim	CA	Honda Center	1998, 2001, 2003, 2011, 2014, 2016, 2019	7
Los Angeles	CA	Los Angeles Memorial Sports Arena	1994	1
Los Angeles	CA	Pauley Pavilion	1966, 1969, 1973, 1976, 1984	5
Los Angeles	CA	Crypto.com Arena	2013, 2015, 2018, 2024, 2027	4
Oakland	CA	Oakland Arena	1990, 1995, 2006	3
San Francisco	CA	California Coliseum	1939	1
Daly City	CA	Cow Palace	1958, 1959	2
San Francisco	CA	Chase Center	2022, 2025, 2028	2
San Jose	CA	SAP Center	1997, 2002, 2007, 2017, 2026	4
Denver	CO	McNichols Sports Arena	1985, 1989, 1996	3
Washington	DC	Capital One Arena	2006, 2013, 2019, 2026	3
Miami	FL	Miami Arena	1994	1
St. Petersburg	FL	Tropicana Field	1998	1
Athens	GA	Stegeman Coliseum	1971	1
Atlanta	GA	Omni Coliseum	1981, 1984, 1986	3
Atlanta	GA	Georgia Dome	1996, 2001, 2004, 2006, 2012	5
Atlanta	GA	State Farm Arena	2018, 2025	2
Rosemont	IL	Allstate Arena	2005	1
Chicago	IL	Chicago Stadium	1952, 1953	2
Chicago	IL	United Center	2016, 2022, 2026	2
Evanston	IL	Welsh–Ryan Arena	1955, 1959, 1967	3
Bloomington	IN	Simon Skjodt Assembly Hall	1981	1
Indianapolis	IN	Hinkle Fieldhouse	1940, 2021	2
Indianapolis	IN	Market Square Arena	1979	1
Indianapolis	IN	Gainbridge Fieldhouse	2021	1
Indianapolis	IN	Lucas Oil Stadium	2009, 2013, 2014, 2021, 2025	5
Ames	IA	Hilton Coliseum	1972	1
Iowa City	IA	Iowa Field House	1954, 1956, 1962, 1966	4
Lawrence	KS	Allen Fieldhouse	1956, 1958, 1959, 1961, 1963, 1967, 1970, 1978	8
Manhattan	KS	Ahearn Field House	1953, 1955, 1960, 1962, 1965, 1969	6
Wichita	KS	Charles Koch Arena	1964, 1968, 1971	3
Lexington	KY	Memorial Coliseum	1957, 1958, 1965, 1968	4
Lexington	KY	Rupp Arena	1977, 1980, 1984, 1989, 1992, 1996, 2002	7
Louisville	KY	Freedom Hall	1960, 1961, 1976, 1987	4
Louisville	KY	KFC Yum! Center	2016, 2019, 2023	3
Baton Rouge	LA	Pete Maravich Assembly Center	1976	1
New Orleans	LA	Devlin Fieldhouse	1942	1
New Orleans	LA	Caesars Superdome	1981, 1990	2
New Orleans	LA	Smoothie King Center	2011	1
College Park	MD	Cole Field House	1962, 1963, 1965, 1967, 1969, 1977	6
Boston	MA	TD Garden	2009, 2012, 2018, 2024	4
Auburn Hills	MI	The Palace of Auburn Hills	2000	1
Detroit	MI	Ford Field	2008	1
Detroit	MI	Little Caesars Arena	2024, 2028	1
E. Lansing	MI	Jenison Fieldhouse	1963	1
Pontiac	MI	Pontiac Silverdome	1988, 1991	2
Minneapolis	MN	Williams Arena	1964	1
Minneapolis	MN	Hubert H. Humphrey Metrodome	1989, 1996, 2003, 2006	4
Kansas City	MO	Municipal Auditorium	1941, 1942, 1943, 1944, 1945, 1946, 1947, 1948, 1949, 1950, 1951, 1952	12
Kansas City	MO	Kemper Arena	1983, 1986, 1992, 1995	4
Kansas City	MO	T-Mobile Center	2017, 2019, 2023, 2027	3
St. Louis	MO	St. Louis Arena	1982, 1984, 1993	3
St. Louis	MO	Enterprise Center	1998	1
St. Louis	MO	The Dome at America's Center	1999, 2004, 2007, 2010, 2012	5
Omaha	NE	CHI Health Center Omaha	2018	1
Las Vegas	NV	T-Mobile Arena	2023	1
East Rutherford	NJ	Meadowlands Arena	1986, 1987, 1988, 1989, 1990, 1991, 1993, 1995, 1999, 2004, 2007	11
Newark	NJ	Prudential Center	2011, 2025	2
Albuquerque	NM	University Arena	1968, 1978, 1992, 2000, 2005	5
Las Cruces	NM	Pan American Center	1975	1
Albany	NY	MVP Arena	2003	1
New York City (Manhattan)	NY	Madison Square Garden (1925)	1943, 1944, 1945, 1946, 1947, 1948, 1949, 1950, 1951	9
New York City (Manhattan)	NY	Madison Square Garden (1968)	2014, 2017, 2023, 2027	3
Syracuse	NY	JMA Wireless Dome	1983, 1997, 2000, 2002, 2005, 2010, 2015	7
Charlotte	NC	Charlotte Coliseum (1956)	1958, 1959, 1960, 1961, 1973	5
Charlotte	NC	Charlotte Coliseum (1988)	1991, 1993	2
Charlotte	NC	Spectrum Center	2008	1
Greensboro	NC	Greensboro Coliseum	1976, 1979, 1998	3
Raleigh	NC	Lenovo Center	2028	0
Raleigh	NC	Reynolds Coliseum	1952, 1953, 1964, 1966, 1968, 1971, 1974, 1982	8
Cincinnati	OH	Heritage Bank Center	1979, 1987	2
Cleveland	OH	Rocket Arena	2015	1
Columbus	OH	St. John Arena	1970	1
Dayton	OH	UD Arena	1972, 1975, 1978	3
Oklahoma City	OK	Myriad Convention Center	1977	1
Stillwater	OK	Gallagher-Iba Arena	1954	1
Tulsa	OK	Mabee Center	1974	1
Corvallis	OR	Gill Coliseum	1952, 1953, 1954, 1955, 1956, 1957, 1964, 1967	7
Portland	OR	Memorial Coliseum	1961	1
Philadelphia	PA	The Palestra	1939, 1954, 1955, 1956, 1957	5
Philadelphia	PA	Spectrum	1980, 1992	2
Philadelphia	PA	Wells Fargo Center	2001, 2016, 2022	3
Providence	RI	Amica Mutual Pavilion	1978, 1985	2
Columbia	SC	Carolina Coliseum	1970	1
Knoxville	TN	Stokely Athletic Center	1983	1
Knoxville	TN	Thompson–Boling Arena	1994, 1999	2
Memphis	TN	FedExForum	2009, 2014, 2017	3
Nashville	TN	Memorial Gym	1973	1
Arlington	TX	AT&T Stadium	2013	1
Austin	TX	Frank Erwin Center	2000, 2005	2
Dallas	TX	Moody Coliseum	1957	1
Dallas	TX	Reunion Arena	1985, 1990, 1994	3
Dallas	TX	American Airlines Center	2024, 2028	1
Houston	TX	Fertitta Center	1973	1
Houston	TX	NRG Stadium	2008, 2010, 2015	3
Houston	TX	The Summit	1980, 1986	2
Houston	TX	Toyota Center	2026	0
Lubbock	TX	Lubbock Municipal Coliseum	1966	1
San Antonio	TX	Alamodome	1997, 2001, 2003, 2007, 2011	5
San Antonio	TX	Frost Bank Center	2022, 2027	1
Ogden	UT	Dee Events Center	1983	1
Provo	UT	Smith Fieldhouse	1962, 1963, 1965	3
Provo	UT	Marriott Center	1972, 1977, 1979, 1982	4
Salt Lake City	UT	Jon M. Huntsman Center	1971, 1981	2
Salt Lake City	UT	Delta Center	2010	1
Seattle	WA	Hec Edmundson Pavilion	1960, 1970	2
Seattle	WA	Kingdome	1987, 1988, 1991, 1993	4
Morgantown	WV	WVU Coliseum	1972	1
Madison	WI	Wisconsin Field House	1941, 1969	2
Madison	WI	Kohl Center	2002	1

== Final Four ==
Between 1939 and 1951, the National Semifinals were hosted at the Regional sites and the National Championship game was hosted at a separate site. For those years, this list only includes the host of the National Championship game. In 1952, the Final Four evolved to the current format of four Regional winners meeting at a separate site.

City	State	Arena	Final Four	No.
Glendale	AZ	State Farm Stadium	2017, 2024	2
Los Angeles	CA	Los Angeles Memorial Sports Arena	1968, 1972	2
San Diego	CA	Pechanga Arena	1975	1
San Francisco (Daly City)	CA	Cow Palace	1960	1
Denver	CO	McNichols Sports Arena	1990	1
St. Petersburg	FL	Tropicana Field	1999	1
Atlanta	GA	Omni Coliseum	1977	1
Atlanta	GA	Georgia Dome	2002, 2007, 2013	3
Atlanta	GA	Mercedes-Benz Stadium	2031	0 (Note: Mercedes-Benz Stadium lost the 2020 tournament because of lockdowns.)
Evanston	IL	Patten Gymnasium	1939	1
Evanston	IL	Welsh–Ryan Arena	1956	1
Indianapolis	IN	Market Square Arena	1980	1
Indianapolis	IN	RCA Dome	1991, 1997, 2000, 2006	4
Indianapolis	IN	Lucas Oil Stadium	2010, 2015, 2021, 2026, 2029	4
Lexington	KY	Rupp Arena	1985	1
Louisville	KY	Freedom Hall	1958, 1959, 1962, 1963, 1967, 1969	6
New Orleans	LA	Caesars Superdome	1982, 1987, 1993, 2003, 2012, 2022	6
College Park	MD	Cole Field House	1966, 1970	2
Detroit	MI	Ford Field	2009, 2027	1
Minneapolis	MN	Williams Arena	1951	1
Minneapolis	MN	Hubert H. Humphrey Metrodome	1992, 2001	2
Minneapolis	MN	U.S. Bank Stadium	2019	1
Kansas City	MO	Municipal Auditorium	1940, 1941, 1942, 1953, 1954, 1955, 1957, 1961, 1964	9
Kansas City	MO	Kemper Arena	1988	1
St. Louis	MO	St. Louis Arena	1973, 1978	2
St. Louis	MO	The Dome at America's Center	2005	1
East Rutherford	NJ	Meadowlands Arena	1996	1
Albuquerque	NM	University Arena	1983	1
New York City (Manhattan)	NY	Madison Square Garden (1925)	1943, 1944, 1945, 1946, 1947, 1948, 1950	7
Charlotte	NC	Charlotte Coliseum (1988)	1994	1
Greensboro	NC	Greensboro Coliseum	1974	1
Las Vegas	NV	Allegiant Stadium	2028	0
Portland	OR	Memorial Coliseum	1965	1
Philadelphia	PA	Spectrum	1976, 1981	2
Arlington	TX	AT&T Stadium	2014, 2030	1
Dallas	TX	Reunion Arena	1986	1
Houston	TX	Astrodome	1971	1
Houston	TX	NRG Stadium	2011, 2016, 2023	3
San Antonio	TX	Alamodome	1998, 2004, 2008, 2018, 2025	5
Salt Lake City	UT	Jon M. Huntsman Center	1979	1
Seattle	WA	Hec Edmundson Pavilion	1949, 1952	2
Seattle	WA	Kingdome	1984, 1989, 1995	3

== See also ==
- List of basketball arenas by capacity
- List of NCAA Division I basketball arenas
