= Scott & Welch =

Scott & Welch was an architectural partnership of Carl W. Scott (born 1887) and George W. Welch (born 1886) that was based in Salt Lake City, Utah and began in 1914. They designed schools, libraries, and other buildings that were built by New Deal programs. A number of their works are listed on the U.S. National Register of Historic Places (NRHP).

Scott was a 1907 graduate, in mining, of the University of Utah. He is credited with the idea for the Block U, made of concrete, which is a prominent icon on a hill above the university.

Welch is a Colorado College graduate who served in the Utah House of Representatives from 1919 to 1921.

== Images of architectural works ==
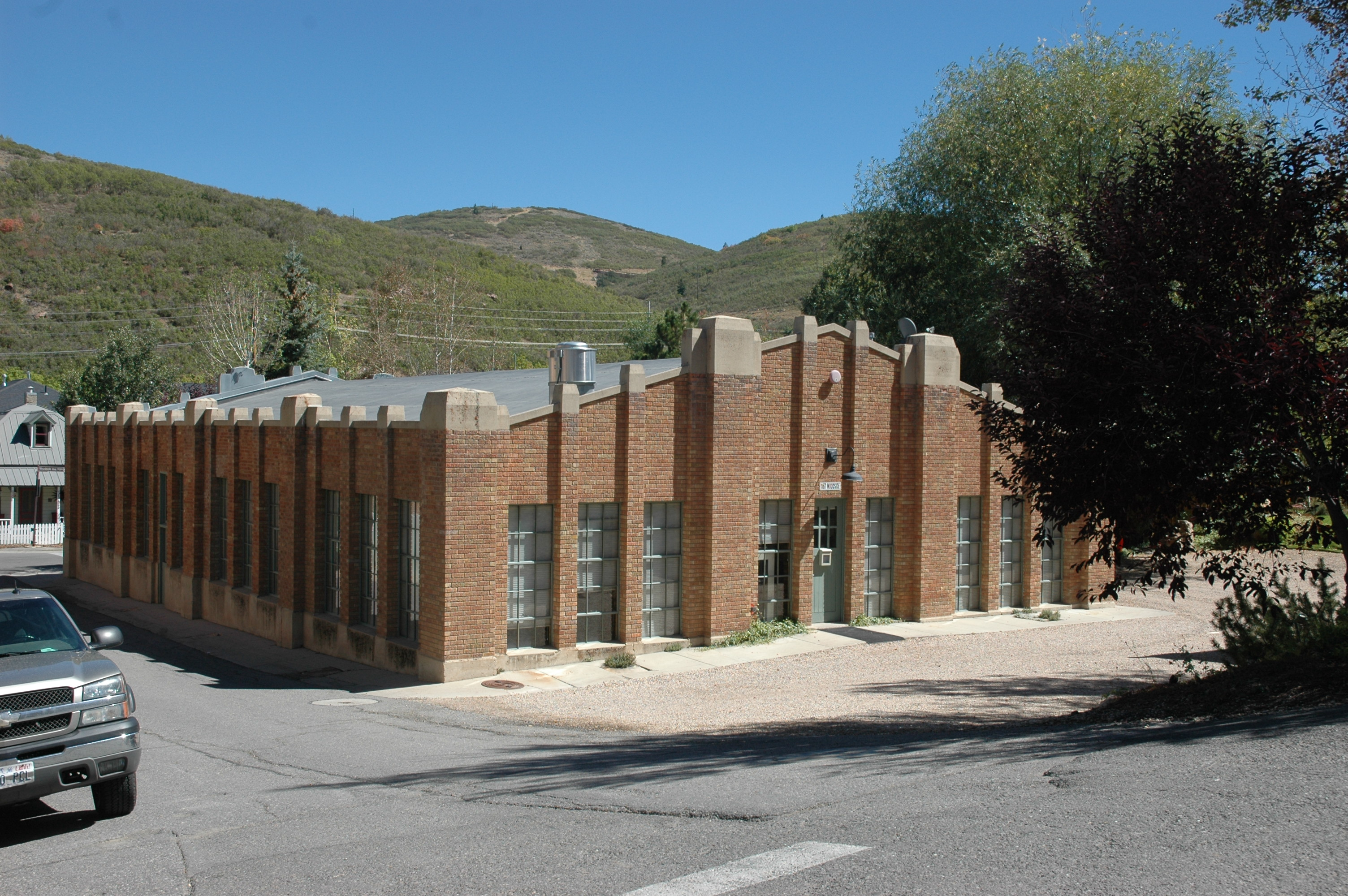
*Park City High School Mechanical Arts Building, 1167 Woodside Park City, UT*NRHP listed

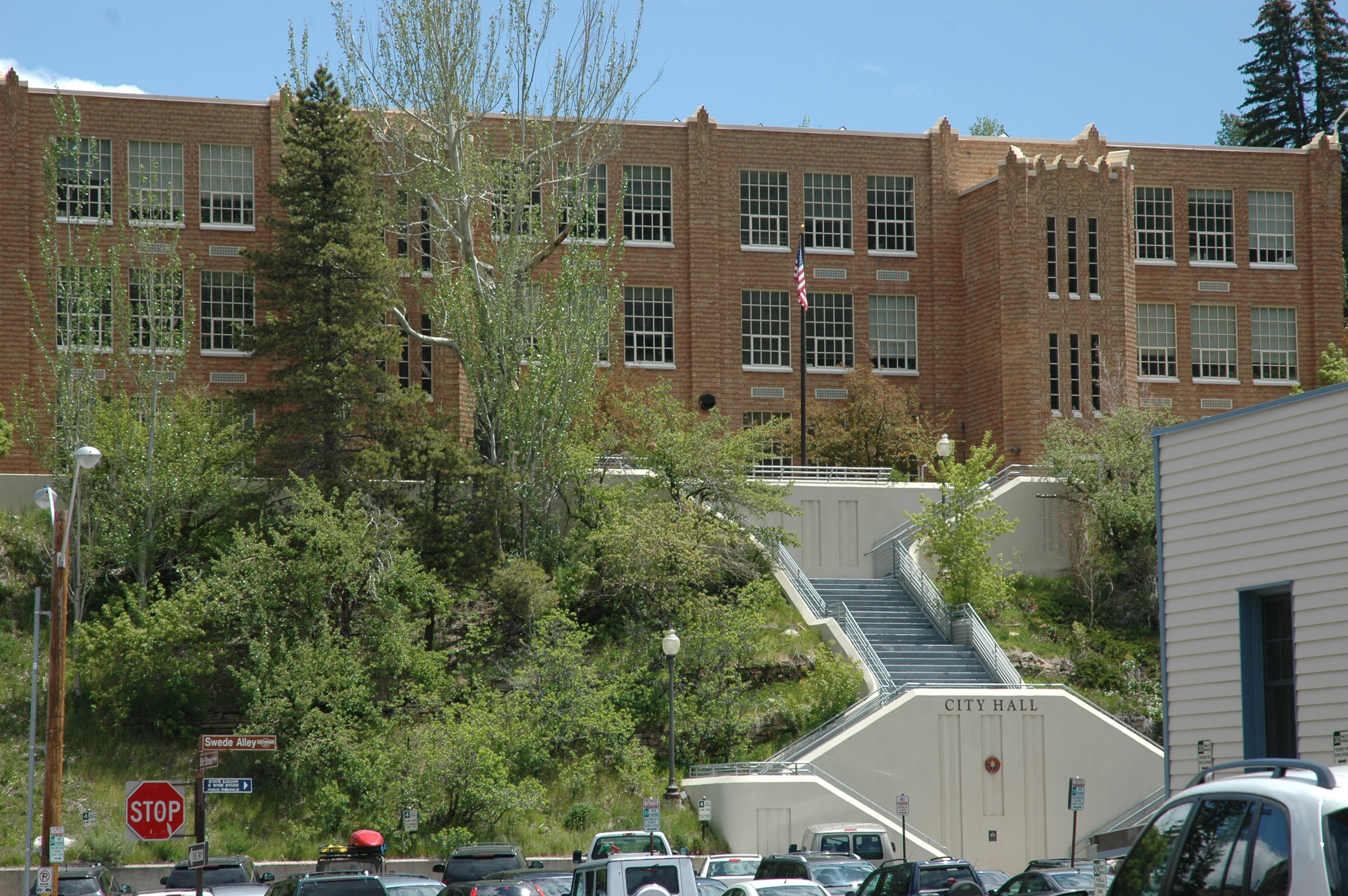
Marsac Elementary School, 431 Marsac Park City, UT*NRHP listed

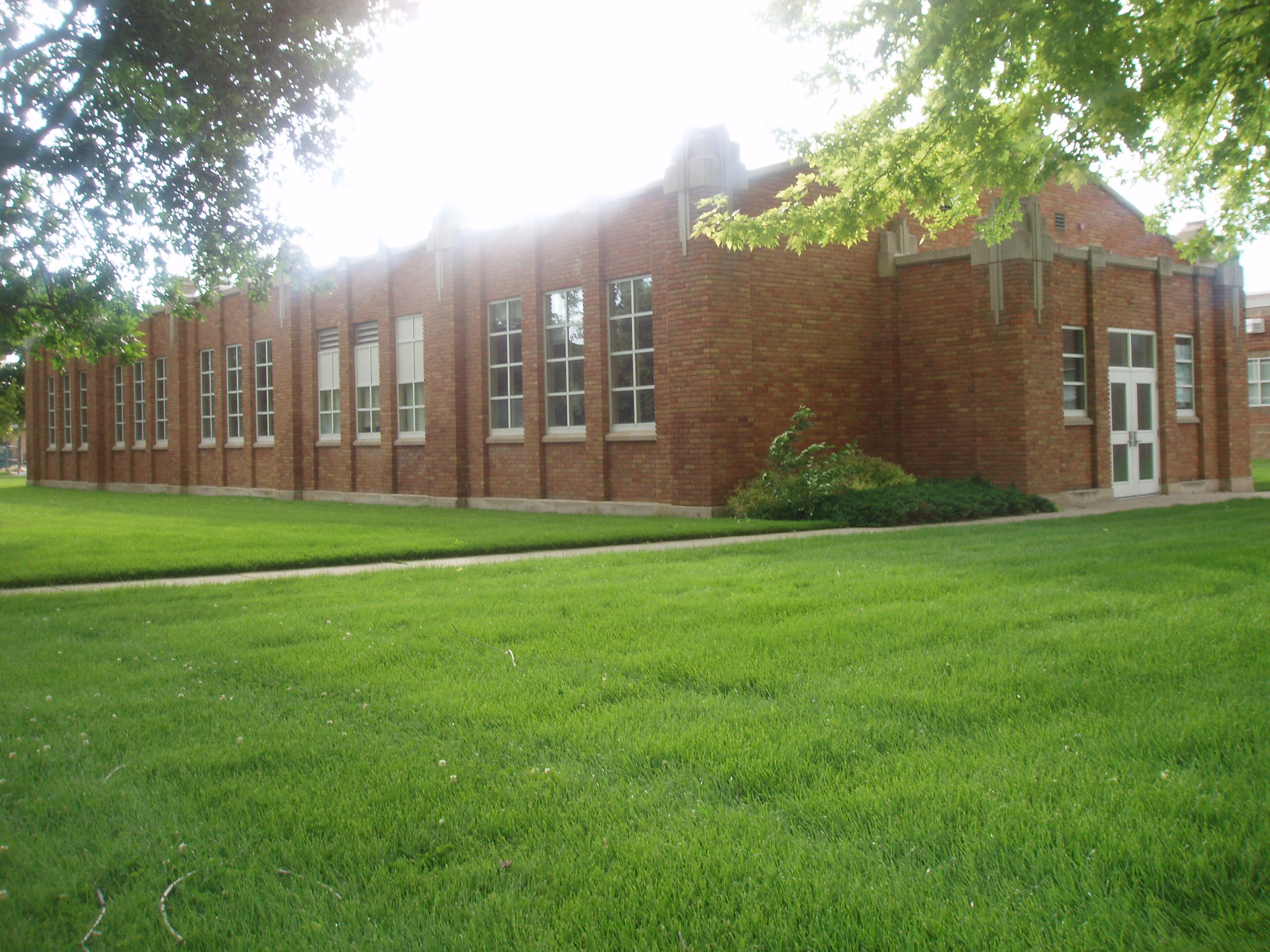
Morgan High School Mechanical Arts Building, 20 N. One Hundred E Morgan, UT*NRHP listed

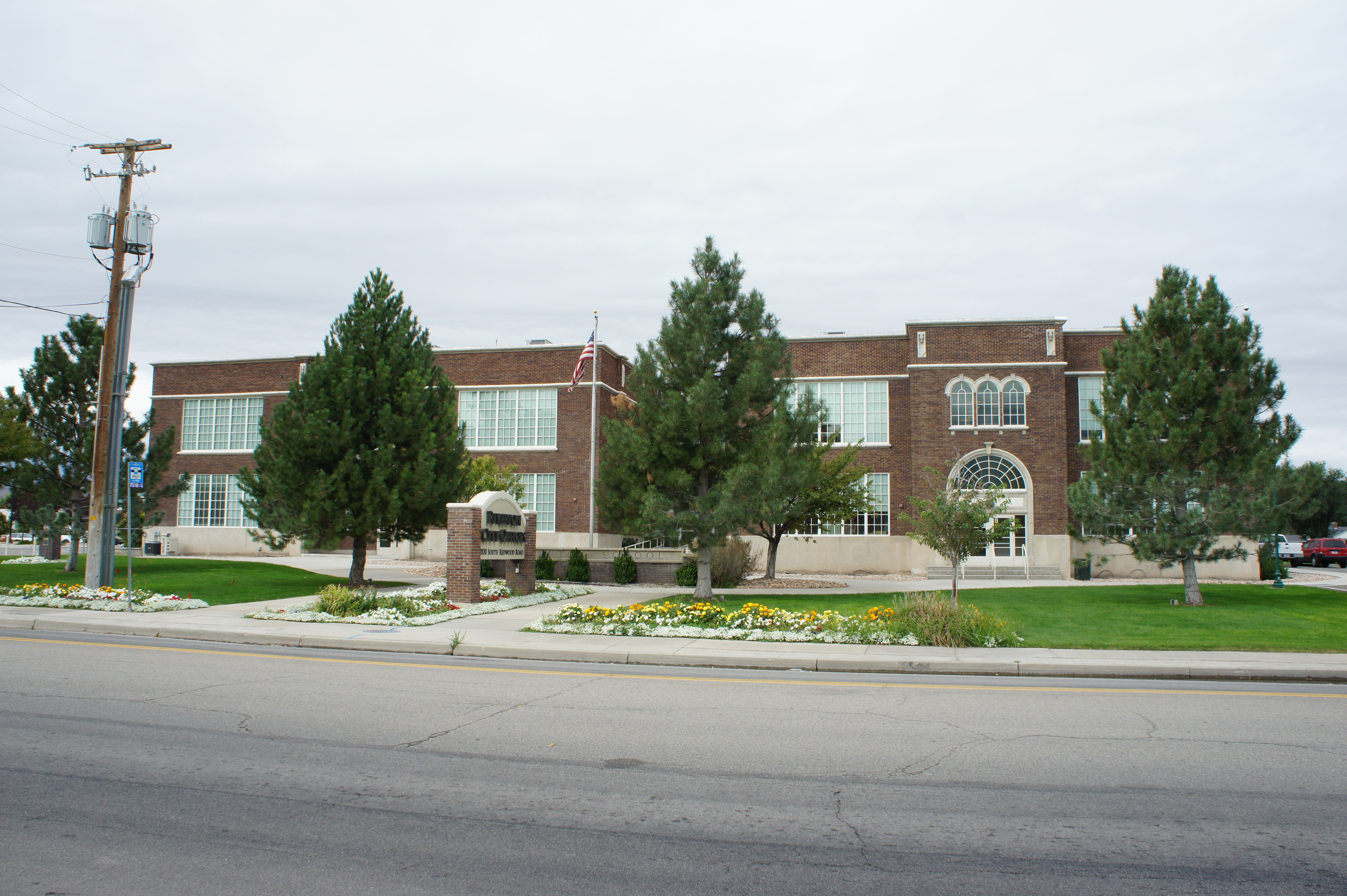
Riverton Elementary School, 12830 S. Redwood Rd. Riverton, UT*NRHP listed

== Other works ==
- N. O. Nelson Manufacturing Company Warehouse, in Salt Lake City
- Nelson-Ricks Creamery Building, in Salt Lake City
- Firestone Tire Company Building, in Salt Lake City
- Hinckley High School Gymnasium, Off US 5/50 Hinckley, UT, NRHP-listed
- Utah Copper Company Mine Superintendent's House, 104 E. State Hwy Copperton, UT, NRHP-listed
- Valley School, Off US 89 Orderville, UT, NRHP-listed
- One or more works in Copperton Historic District, Roughly bounded by SR 48, Fifth E, Hillcrest, and Second West Sts. Copperton, UT, NRHP-listed
