= Carlson Hall =

Historic building in Salt Lake City, Utah, U.S.

- U.S. National Register of Historic Places
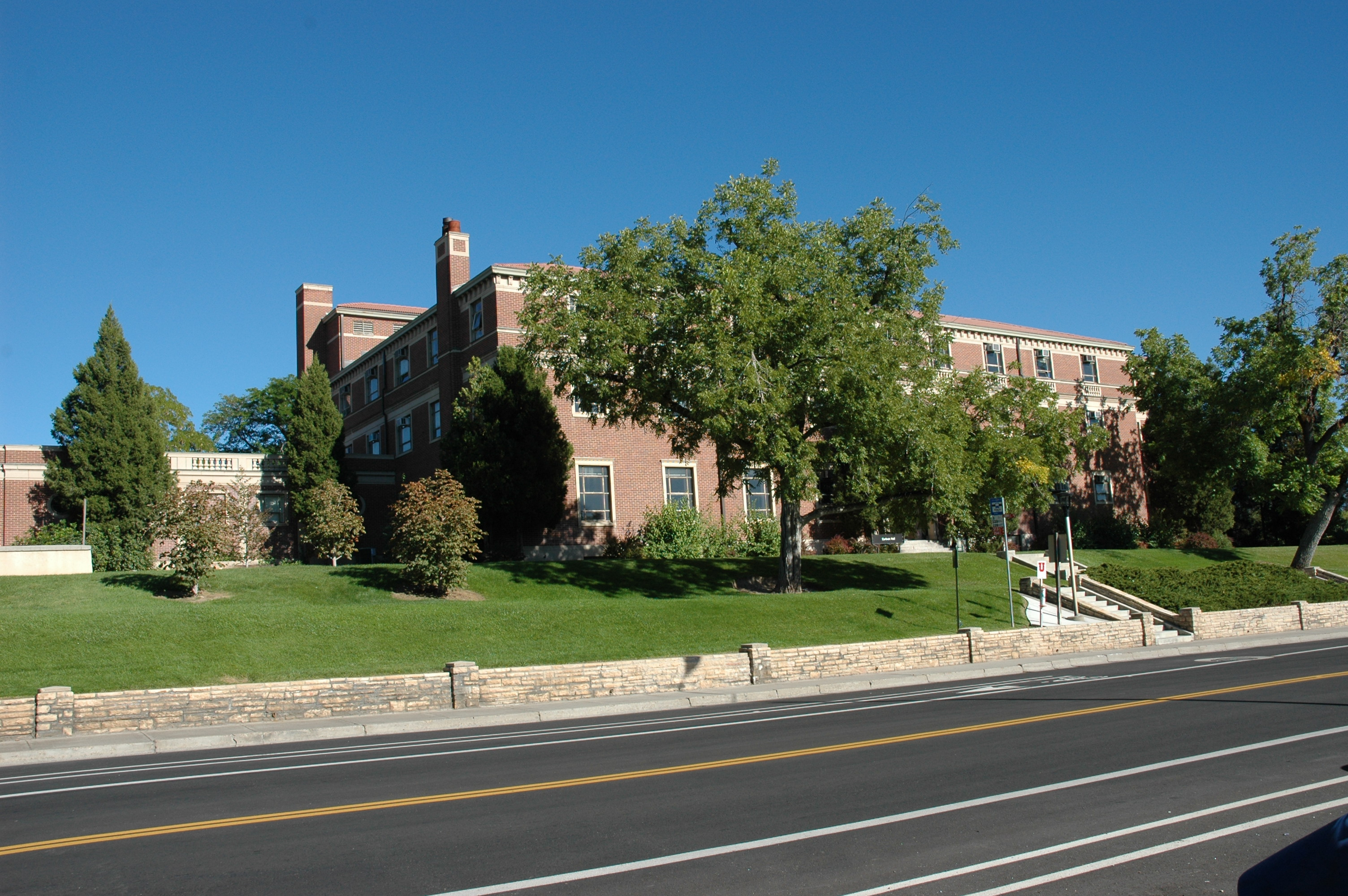

- Location within Utah Location within the United States
- Location: 369 South University Street; Salt Lake City, Utah; United States
- Coordinates: 40°45′41″N 111°51′4″W
- Area: less than one acre
- Built: 1937-38
- Built by: Paul Paulsen
- Architect: Ashton & Evans
- Architectural style: Renaissance
- Demolished: 2012
- MPS: Public Works Buildings TR
- NRHP reference No.: 96000414
- Added to NRHP: April 12, 1996

Carlson Hall at the University of Utah in Salt Lake City, Utah, United States was built during 1937–38. It was listed on the National Register of Historic Places in 1996, and was a part of the campus until it was demolished in 2012.

== Description ==
The buildings is significant as one of only two historic women's dormitories in Utah, and as a Works Progress Administration (WPA) project. It was built after a "three-decade long struggle to have a women's dormitory constructed" at the University of Utah, initiated by Lucy M. Van Cott, Dean of Women at the university for 25 years. The cause was supported by the Utah Federation of Women's Clubs, who lobbied the state legislature for a bill to provide funding, but that bill failed to pass in 1913.

It was eventually funded by an estate gift of $121,000 from Mary P. Carlson, plus $90,000 of WPA funding.

For many years, Carlson Hall housed the University of Utah's History Department, and in its final years it was used for office and classroom space by the S.J. Quinney College of Law. In Summer 2012, Carlson Hall was demolished to make way for a new expanded home for the College of Law.

== See also ==
- National Register of Historic Places listings in Salt Lake City
