= Moroni High School Mechanical Arts Building =

- U.S. National Register of Historic Places
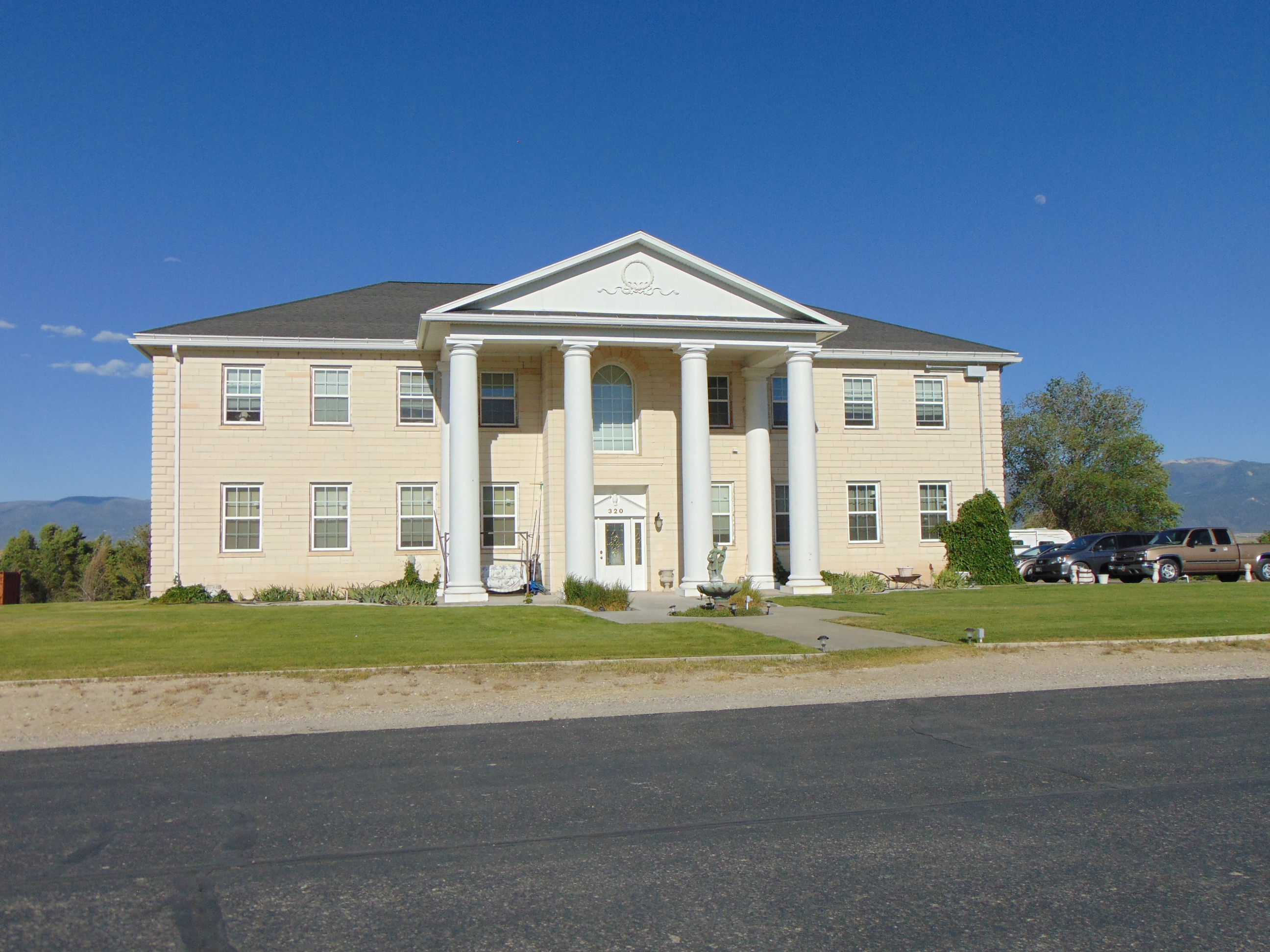
- As of June 2018, used as a private home

- Location within Utah Location within the United States
- Location: 350 North Center Street; Moroni, Utah; United States
- Coordinates: 39.530648°N 111.583468°W
- Area: less than one acre
- Built: 1935
- MPS: Public Works Buildings TR
- NRHP reference No.: 85000812
- Added to NRHP: April 1, 1985

The Moroni High School Mechanical Arts Building is a historic former school building in Moroni, Utah, United States, that is listed on the National Register of Historic Places (NRHP).

== Description ==
Located at 350 North Center Street, it was built in 1935–36. It was listed on the NRHP April 1985.

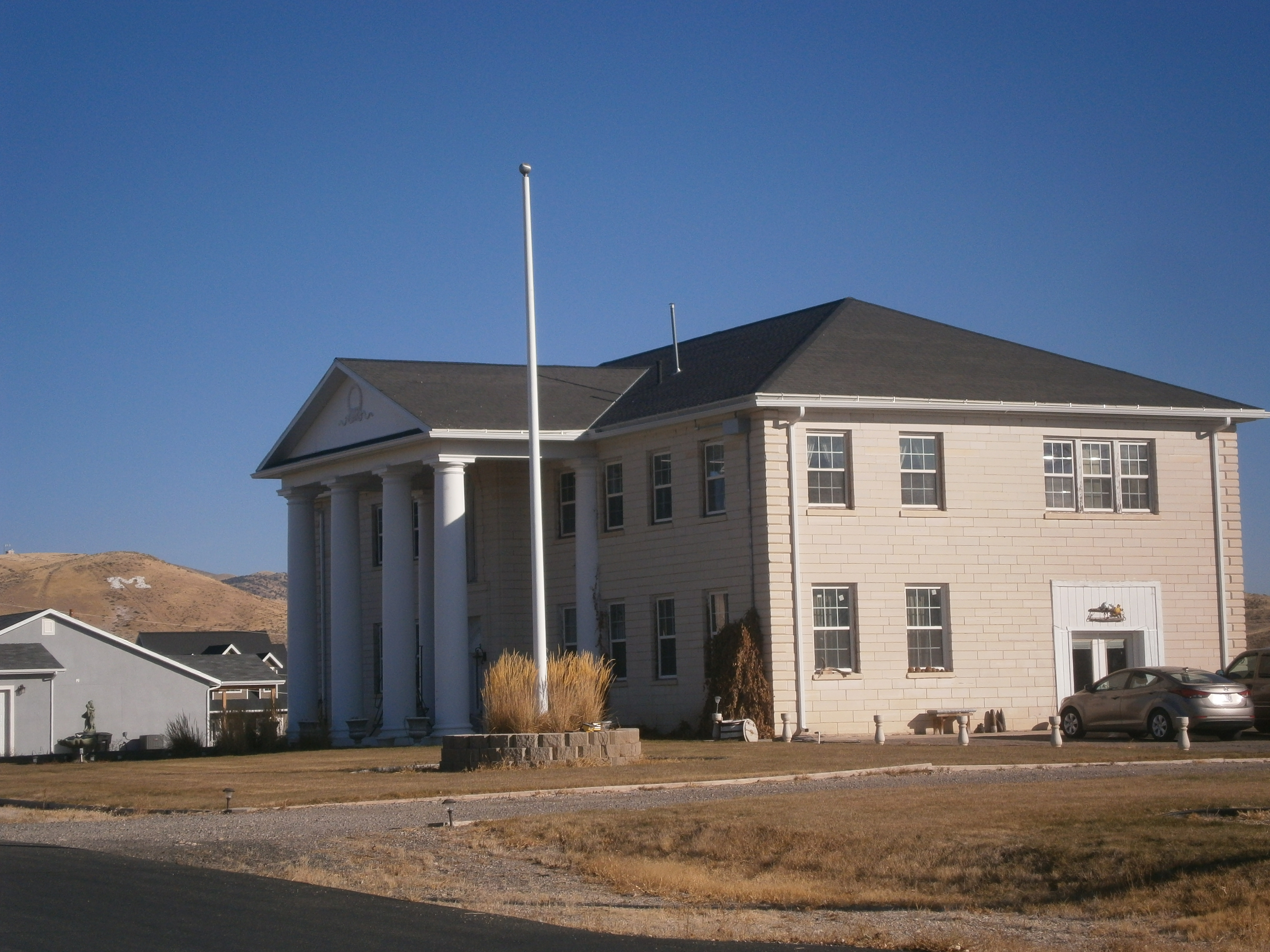
Moroni High School Mechanical Arts Building, November 2019

From its Utah State Historical Society assessment: "The building was constructed between 1935 and 1936 as a Federal Emergency Relief Administration (FERA) project. It was a duplicate of the Mt. Pleasant High School Mechanical Arts Building that was constructed at the same time. The project was approved in November 1934; construction began in January of 1935 and was completed in April 1936."

The building, in 2007, had gained a two-story tetrastyle portico.

It is one of five mechanical arts buildings listed on the National Register in Utah. The other four are:

- Morgan High School Mechanical Arts Building (1936), Morgan, Utah
- Mount Pleasant High School Mechanical Arts Building (1935–36), Mount Pleasant, Utah
- Park City High School Mechanical Arts Building (1935–36), Park City, Utah
- Springville High School Mechanical Arts Building (1929), Springville, Utah

== See also ==
- National Register of Historic Places listings in Sanpete County, Utah
