= Morgan High School Mechanical Arts Building =

- U.S. National Register of Historic Places
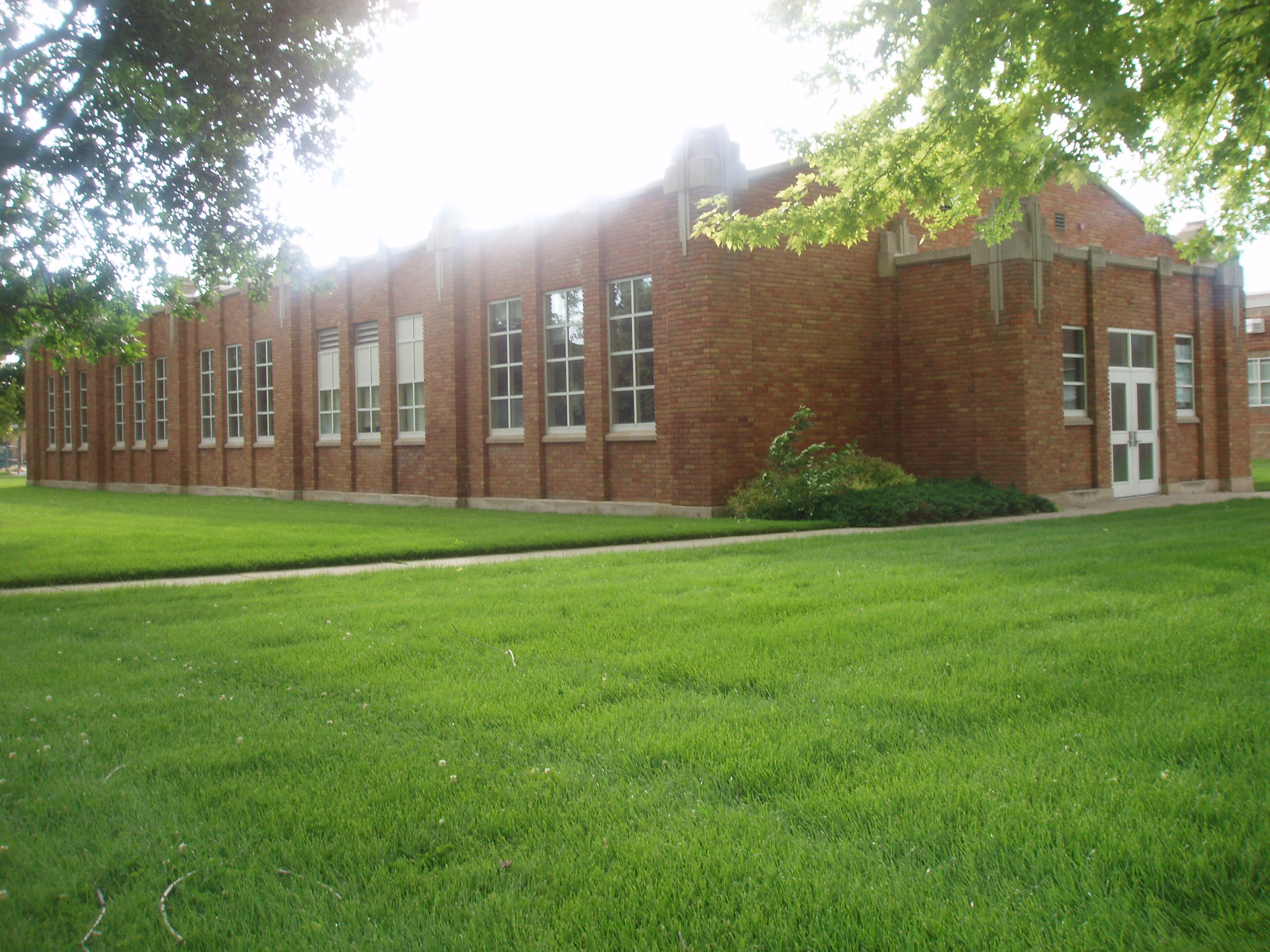

- Location within Utah Location within the United States
- Location: 20 N. One Hundred E, Morgan, Utah
- Coordinates: 41°02′13″N 111°40′31″W
- Area: 1 acre (0.40 ha)
- Built: 1936
- Architect: Scott & Welch
- Architectural style: Art Deco
- MPS: Public Works Buildings TR
- NRHP reference No.: 86000738
- Added to NRHP: April 9, 1986

The Morgan High School Mechanical Arts Building, at 20 N. One Hundred E in Morgan, Utah, was built in 1936. It was listed on the National Register of Historic Places in 1986.

It is Art Deco in style, and was probably designed by Salt Lake City architects Scott & Welch. It is a one-story brick building with a gable roof surrounded by a parapet wall. Its walls are divided into panels by pilasters which have "stylized geometric capitals" made of concrete" which "project upward through the coping at the edge of the roof, giving the building a crenelated appearance."

There are currently five mechanical arts buildings listed on the National Register in Utah. The other four are:

- Moroni High School Mechanical Arts Building (1935–36), Moroni, Utah
- Mount Pleasant High School Mechanical Arts Building (1935–36), Mount Pleasant, Utah
- Park City High School Mechanical Arts Building (1935–36), Park City, Utah
- Springville High School Mechanical Arts Building (1929), Springville, Utah

== See also ==
- Morgan High School (Utah)
