= Raymond J. Ashton =

American architect (1887–1973)

- Born: January 23, 1887; Salt Lake City
- Died: April 7, 1973 (aged 86); Prescott, Arizona
- Occupation: Architect

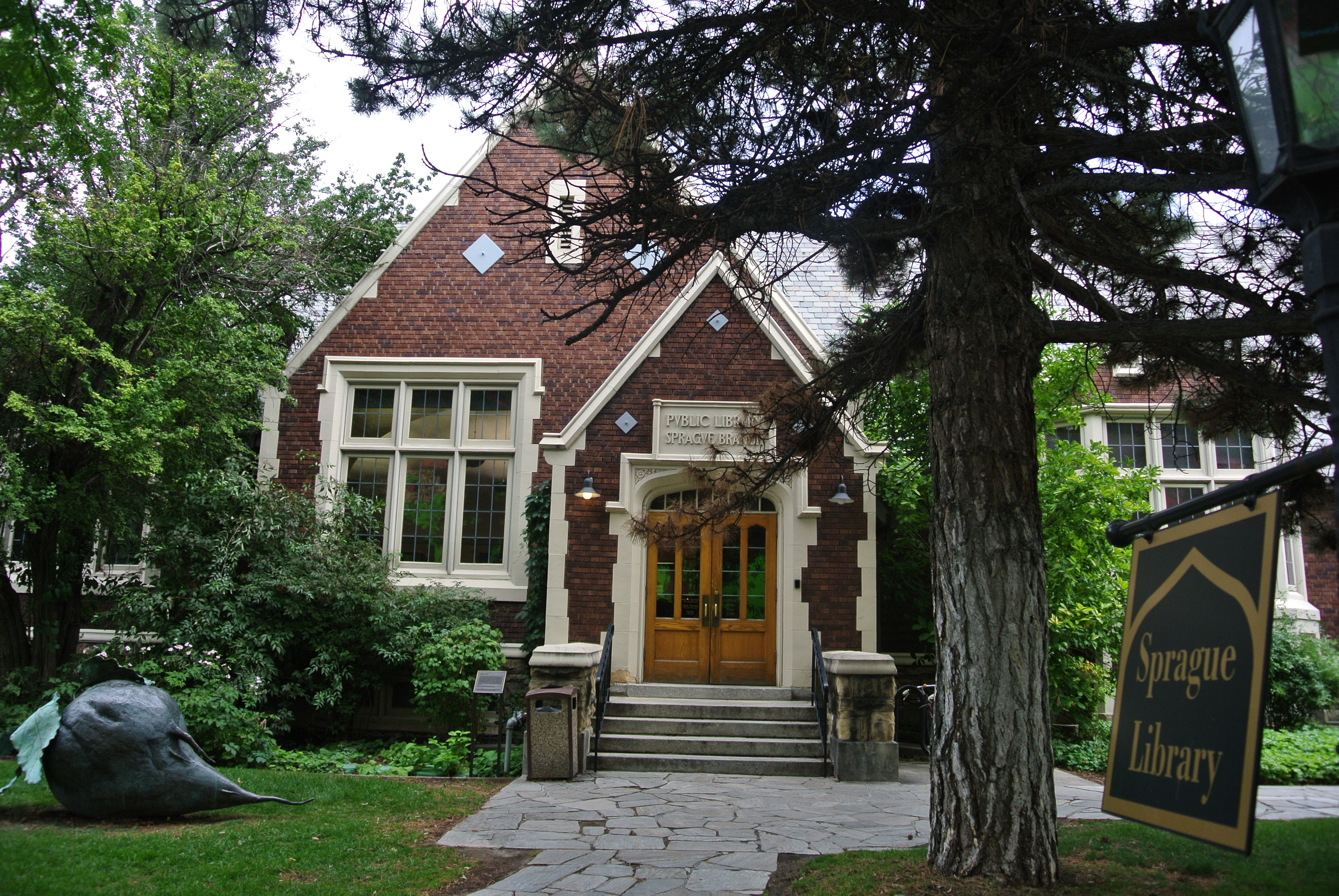
The Sprague Branch of the Salt Lake City Public Library, built in 1928.

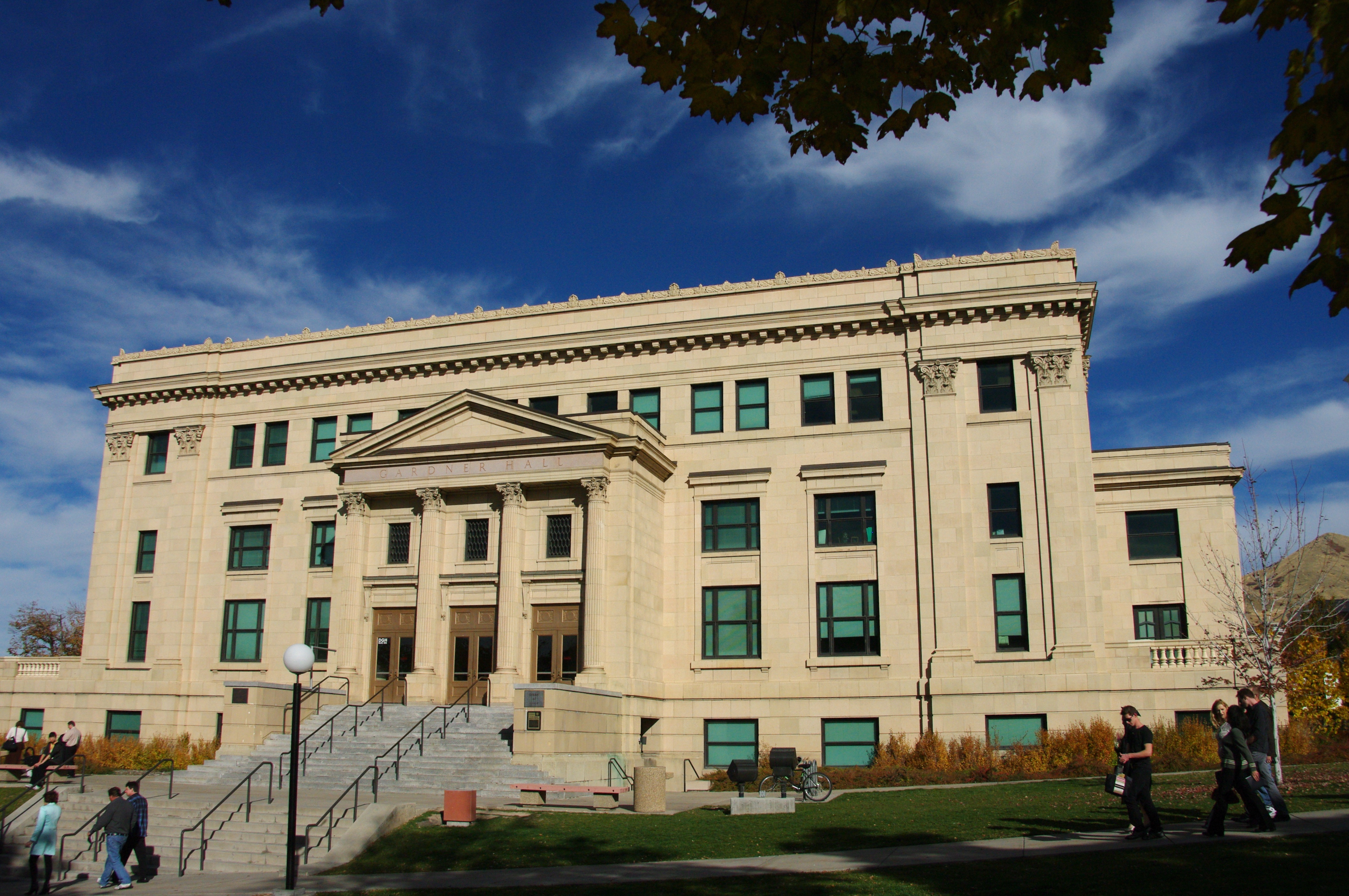
Gardner Hall of the University of Utah, designed by Ashton & Evans and built in 1931.

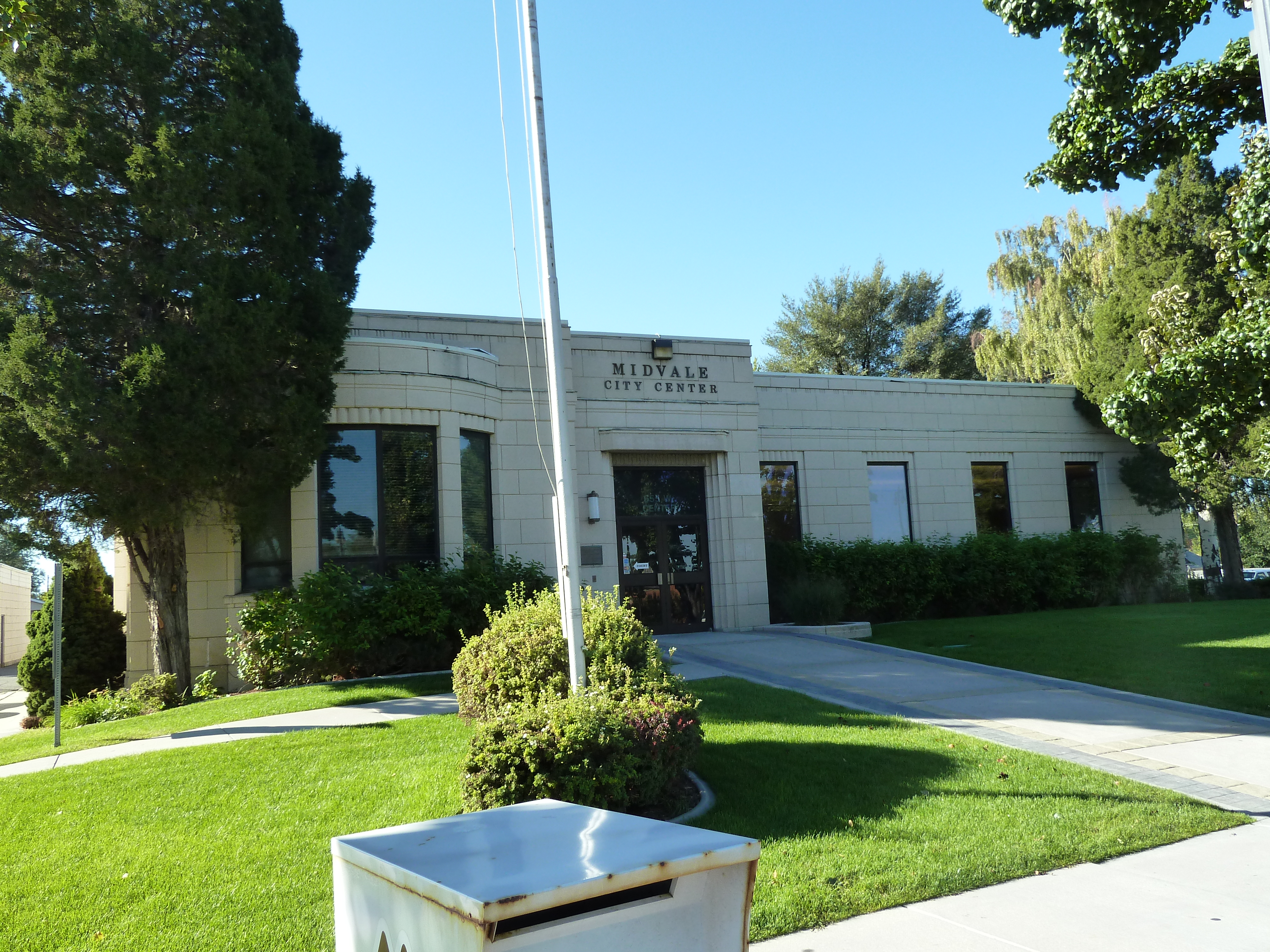
The former Salt Lake County Library in Midvale, completed in 1941.

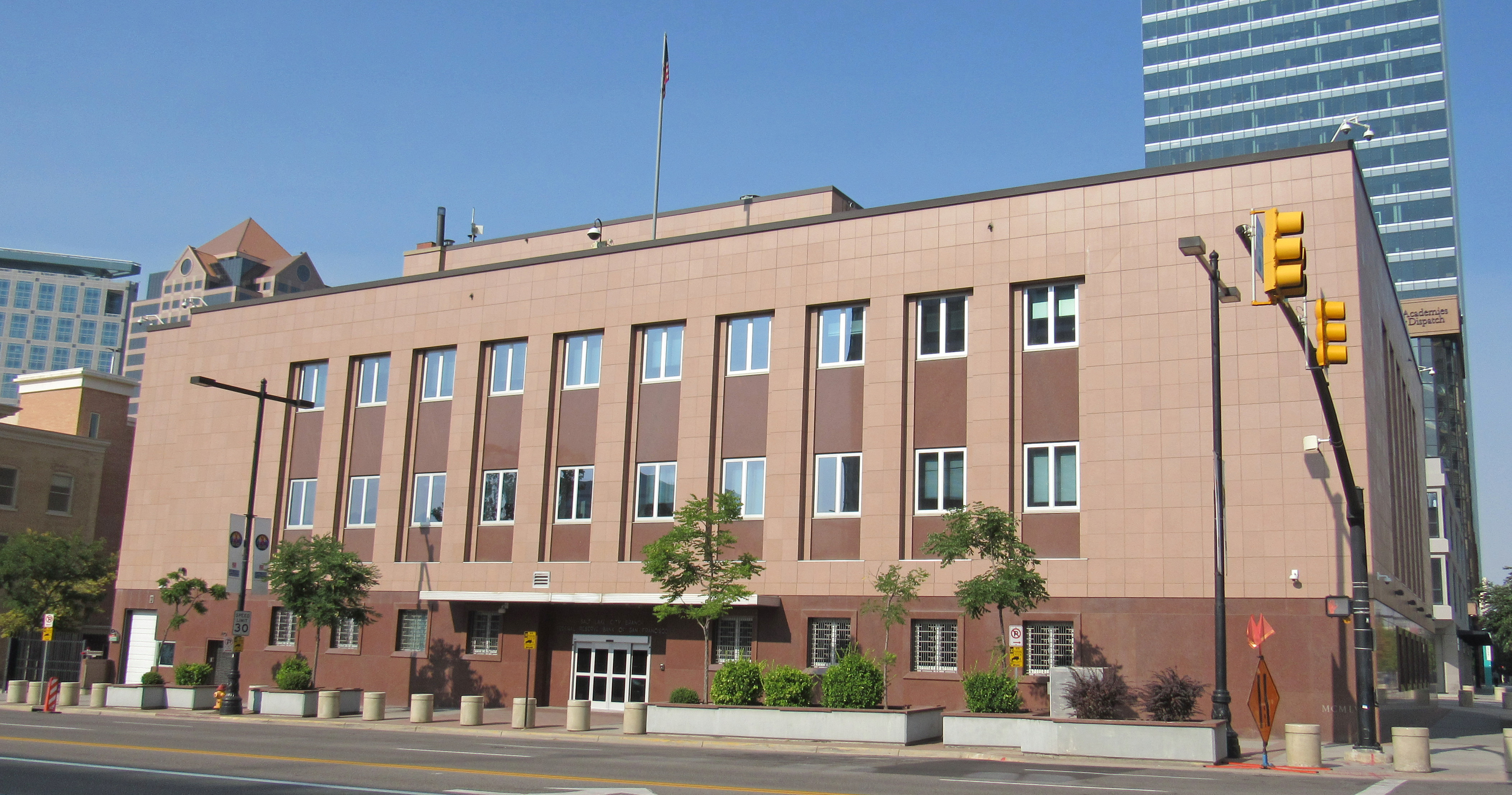
The Federal Reserve Bank of San Francisco Salt Lake City Branch, completed in 1959.

Raymond J. Ashton FAIA (1887–1973) was an American architect in practice in Salt Lake City from 1919 until 1970. From 1943 to 1945 he was president of the American Institute of Architects.

== Life and career ==
Raymond Joy Ashton was born January 23, 1887, in Salt Lake City. He was educated in the public schools and at the University of Utah engineering school, from which he graduated in 1909. A Mormon, after his graduation he left for Europe as a missionary of the church serving primarily in Belgium. He returned to the United States in 1912 and worked for his family's building firm in Salt Lake City. In 1916, he moved to Chicago where he worked as a draftsman for several firms as well as attending night school at Atelier Puckey (a member of the Society of Beaux-Arts Architects) and the Chicago Academy of Fine Arts.

When World War I halted nonessential building projects, Raymond joined the architectural department of Armour & Company, designing branch houses throughout the world, and residential work for the Armour family.

In 1919 he returned to Salt Lake City, where he formed a partnership with architect Francis D. Rutherford. In 1920 Rutherford left for California, and Ashton continued the practice on his own. In 1923 he formed a new partnership with Raymond Evans, known as Ashton & Evans. With the addition of Bernis Eugene Brazier in 1946 the firm became Ashton, Evans & Brazier. The firm became Ashton, Evans, Brazier & Associates in 1962 with the appointment of Frederick Montmorency as partner and Ashton, Brazier, Montmorency & Associates in 1963 after Raymond Evans' death. After Ashton's retirement in 1970 the firm became Brazier, Montmorency, Hayes & Talbot, with Brazier at the head of the firm. Brazier died shortly afterward, after which Montmorency assumed control. The firm is still in business today (2022) as MHTN Architects.

Ashton joined the American Institute of Architects in 1927 as a member of the Utah chapter. Over the next several years he served as chapter secretary, treasurer and president. In 1932 he was elected to the national board of directors, and served three years. In 1940 he was elected a Fellow, the organization's highest membership in honor, and was elected treasurer in 1942. In 1943 he was elected to a single one-year term as president, succeeding Richmond Harold Shreve. His term was extended to two years due to World War II.

== Personal life and death ==
Ashton was married in 1913 to Winnie Richards of Salt Lake City. They had three children. In 1970 the Ashtons retired to Prescott, Arizona, where Ashton died April 7, 1973.

== Legacy ==
At least eleven of Ashton's works have been listed on the United States National Register of Historic District, and others contribute to listed historic districts.

== Architectural works ==
- Booth-Parsons house, 1884 S 900 E, Salt Lake City, Utah (1912, NRHP 2012)
- George Albert Smith house, 1302 E Yale Ave, Salt Lake City, Utah (1913, NRHP 1993)
- Millard County Courthouse, 50 S Main St, Fillmore, Utah (1920–21)
- Irving Junior High School additions, 1179 E 2100 S, Salt Lake City, Utah (1926 and 1930, NRHP 1978)
- Sprague Branch of the Salt Lake City Public Library, 2131 S. Highland Dr., Salt Lake City, Utah (1928, NRHP 2003)
- Springville High School Mechanical Arts Building, 443 S 200 E, Springville, Utah (1929, NRHP 1993)
- Crescent Elementary School, 11100 S 230 E, Sandy, Utah (1930, NRHP 2000)
- Gardner Hall, (Note: A contributing property to the University of Utah Circle historic district, NRHP-listed in 1978.) University of Utah, Salt Lake City, Utah (1930–31)
- Riverton Elementary School gymnasium, 12830 S Redwood Rd, Riverton, Utah (1930, NRHP 1996)
- George Thomas Building, University of Utah, Salt Lake City, Utah (1934–35)
- Carlson Hall, University of Utah, Salt Lake City, Utah (1937–38, NRHP 1996, demolished 2012)
- Nielsen Fieldhouse, University of Utah, Salt Lake City, Utah (1939–40)
- Salt Lake County Library, 665 W Center St, Midvale, Utah (1940–41, NRHP 1996)
- Kaysville City Hall, 44 N Main St, Kaysville, Utah (1941–43, NRHP 2019)
- Rich County Courthouse, 20 S Main St, Randolph, Utah (1941–42)
- Utah State Prison (former), 14425 Bitterbrush Ln S, Draper, Utah (1950)
- Federal Reserve Bank of San Francisco Salt Lake City Branch, 120 S State St, Salt Lake City, Utah (1957–59)
- Terminal, Salt Lake City International Airport, Salt Lake City, Utah (1961, demolished)
- Wayne County High School, 55 N Center St, Bicknell, Utah (no date, NRHP 1985, demolished)
