= Hinckley High School Gymnasium =

- U.S. National Register of Historic Places
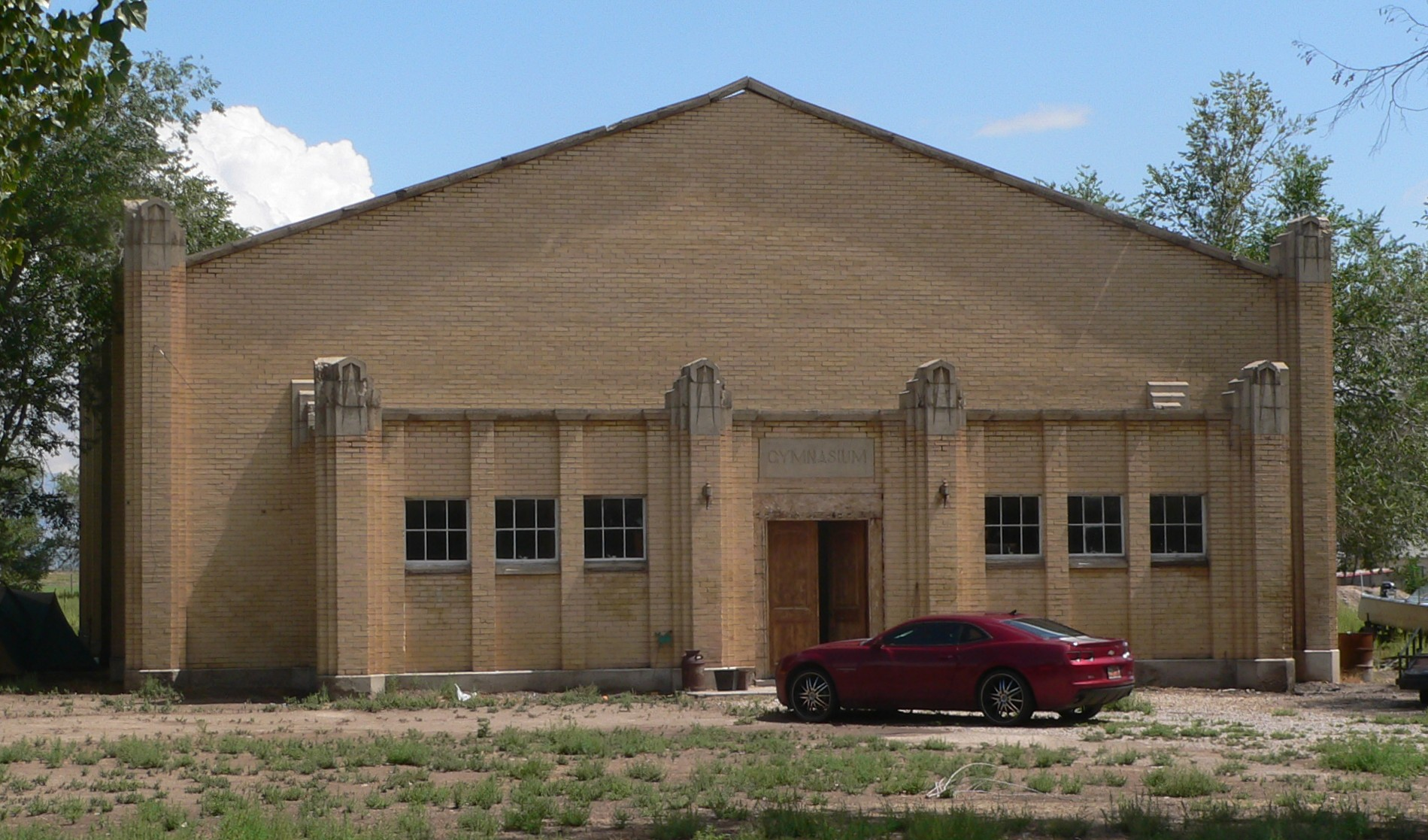

- Location within Utah Location within the United States
- Location: Off US 5/50, Hinckley, Utah
- Coordinates: 39°19′34″N 112°40′10″W
- Area: less than one acre
- Built: 1935-36
- Built by: Talboe & Litchfield
- Architect: Scott & Welch
- Architectural style: Art Deco
- MPS: Public Works Buildings TR
- NRHP reference No.: 85000809
- Added to NRHP: April 1, 1985

The Hinckley High School Gymnasium, located off US 5/50 or at 100 East south of 200 North, in Hinckley, Utah, was built in 1935–36. It was listed on the National Register of Historic Places in 1985.

It is an Art Deco style building, deemed significant as representing the New Deal programs in Utah.

The architect was Scott & Welch and it was built by Talboe & Litchfield.
