= Park City High School Mechanical Arts Building =

- U.S. National Register of Historic Places
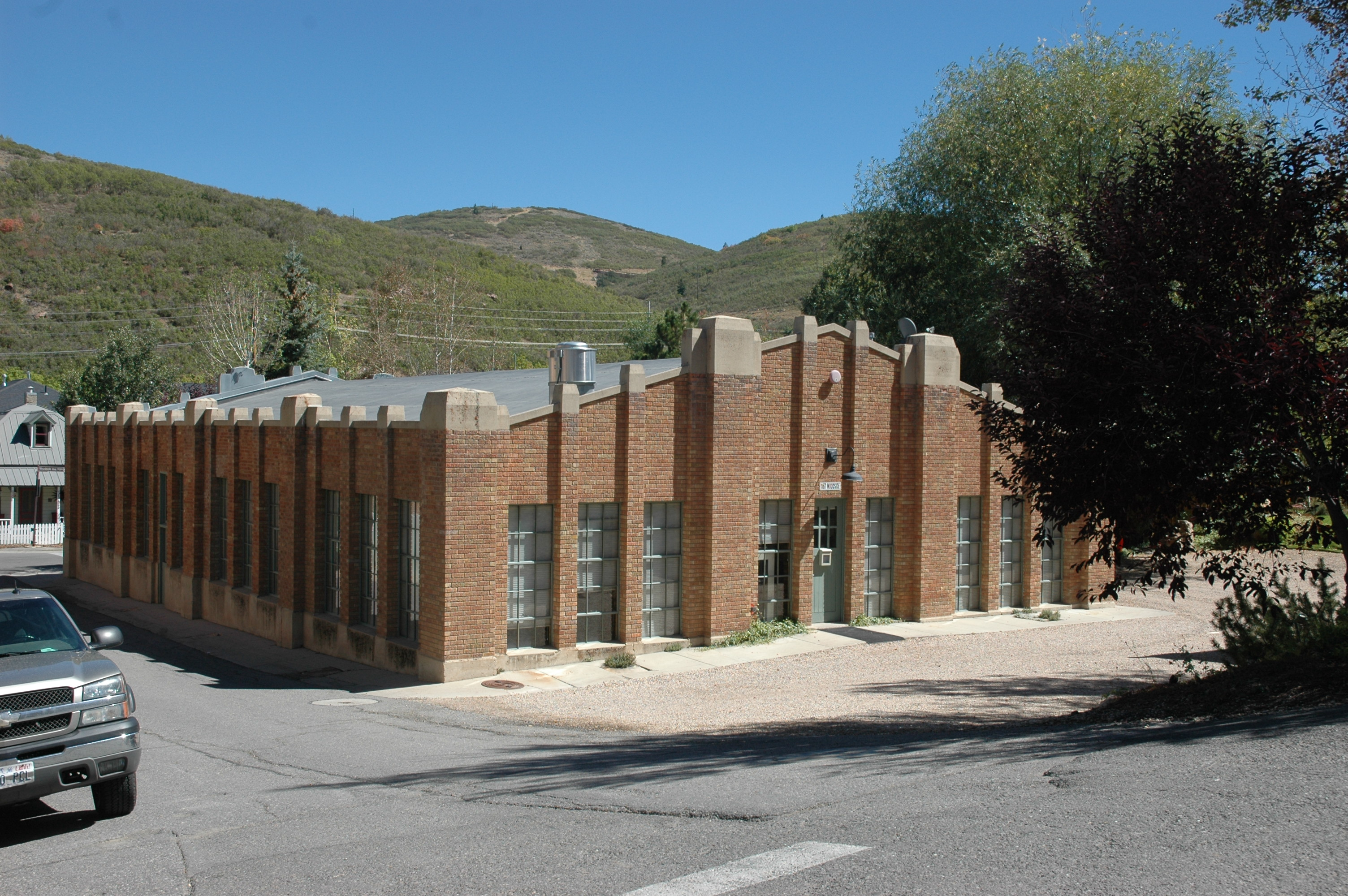

- Location within Utah Location within the United States
- Location: 1167 Woodside, Park City, Utah
- Coordinates: 40°39′01″N 111°30′09″W
- Area: less than one acre
- Built: 1935-36
- Built by: Works Project Administration (WPA)
- Architect: Scott & Welch
- Architectural style: Moderne
- MPS: Public Works Buildings TR
- NRHP reference No.: 96001324
- Added to NRHP: November 7, 1996

The Park City High School Mechanical Arts Building, at 1167 Woodside in Park City, Utah, was built in 1935–36. It was listed on the National Register of Historic Places in 1996.

It is Moderne in style.

It was built as a Works Project Administration project.

There are currently five mechanical arts buildings listed on the National Register in Utah. The other four are:

- Morgan High School Mechanical Arts Building (1936), Morgan, Utah
- Moroni High School Mechanical Arts Building (1935–36), Moroni, Utah
- Mount Pleasant High School Mechanical Arts Building (1935–36), Mount Pleasant, Utah
- Springville High School Mechanical Arts Building (1929), Springville, Utah
