= Valley School (Orderville, Utah) =

- Formerly listed on the U.S. National Register of Historic Places
- Location within Utah Location within the United States
- Location: Off US 89, Orderville, Utah
- Coordinates: 37°16′45″N 112°38′18″W
- Area: 1 acre (0.40 ha)
- Built: 1935
- Architect: Scott & Welch
- Architectural style: PWA Moderne
- MPS: Public Works Buildings TR
- NRHP reference No.: 85000807

Significant dates
- Added to NRHP: April 1, 1985
- Removed from NRHP: December 29, 2025

The Valley School in Orderville, Utah was built in 1935–36, and was listed on the National Register of Historic Places in 1985.

It is a yellow brick building, built as a Public Works Administration project. It originally held the Orderville Elementary School on its upper, main floor, and had the adjoining high school's home economics and shop departments in its raised basement. It was designed by architects Scott & Welch in PWA Moderne style.
