= Mount Pleasant High School Mechanical Arts Building =

- U.S. National Register of Historic Places
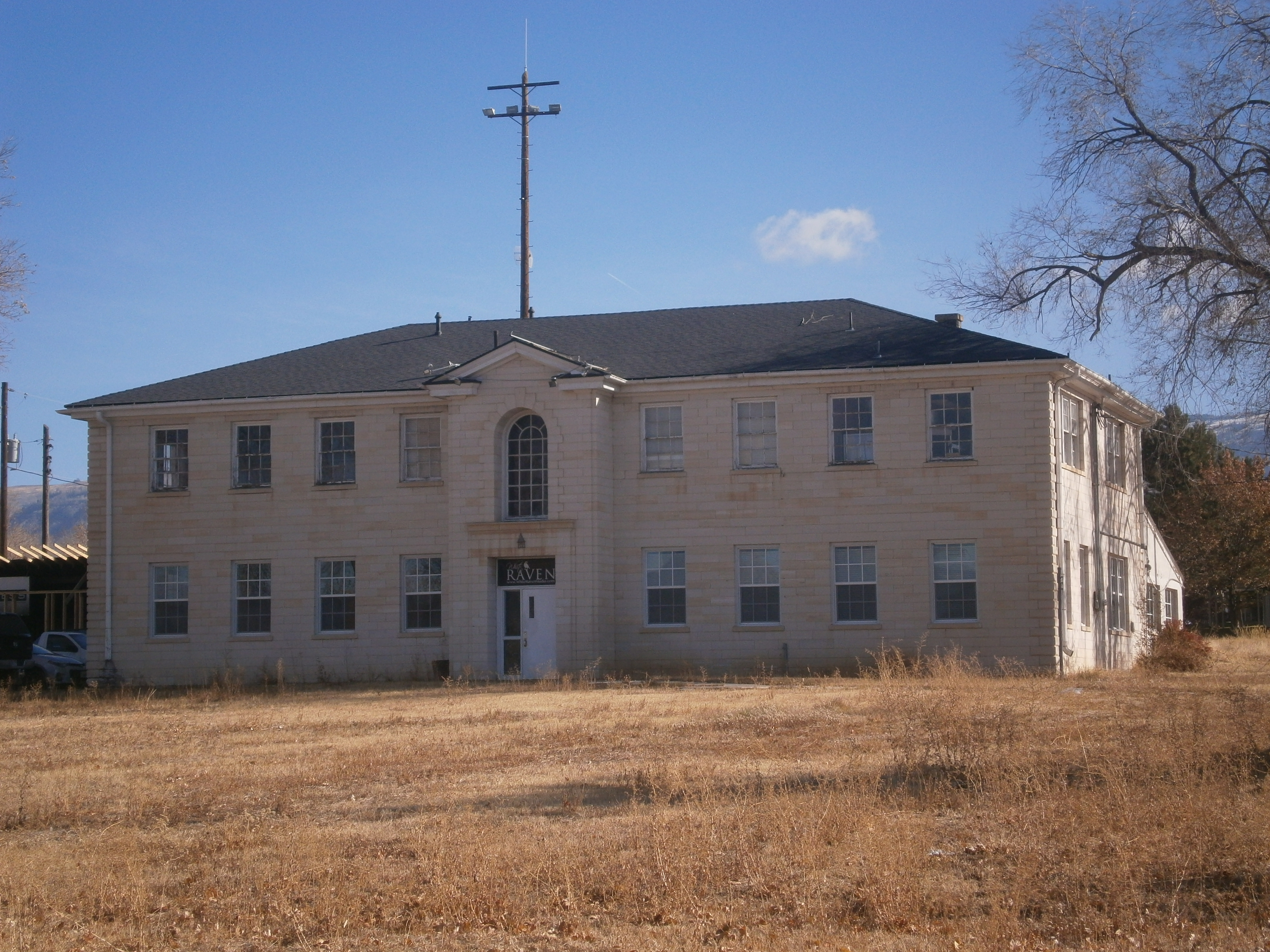

- Location within Utah Location within the United States
- Location: 150 N. State St., Mount Pleasant, Utah
- Coordinates: 39.549385°N 111.454380°W
- Area: less than one acre
- Built: 1935-36
- MPS: Public Works Buildings TR
- NRHP reference No.: 85000813
- Added to NRHP: April 1, 1985

The Mount Pleasant High School Mechanical Arts Building, at 150 N. State St. in Mount Pleasant, Utah, was built in 1935. It was listed on the National Register of Historic Places in 1985.

It was built in 1935–36 as a Depression-era public works project, in particular as a Federal Emergency Relief Administration (FERA) project.

It "is one of three high school shop buildings constructed in Sanpete County using the same basic design. The other two are in Ephraim and Moroni, both of which are still standing and eligible for nomination. All three of these buildings are large, two-story box-like structures with rectangular plans and centrally placed two-story entrance porticos. The Mt. Pleasant building, like the one in Moroni, is built of cream-colored limestone and has a low-pitched hip roof. The openings are arranged symmetrically around the entrance bay which has a gable roof, heavy cornice returns, a round arch upper story window, and a molded cornice over the door itself. There are low-relief quoins at the corners. [As of 1984] The building remains in good original condition."

The Ephraim one seems not to have been listed, but the Moroni one was. There are currently five mechanical arts buildings listed on the National Register in Utah:

- Morgan High School Mechanical Arts Building (1936), Morgan, Utah
- Moroni High School Mechanical Arts Building (1935–36), Moroni, Utah
- Park City High School Mechanical Arts Building (1935–36), Park City, Utah
- Springville High School Mechanical Arts Building (1929), Springville, Utah
