= Kaysville City Hall =

- U.S. National Register of Historic Places
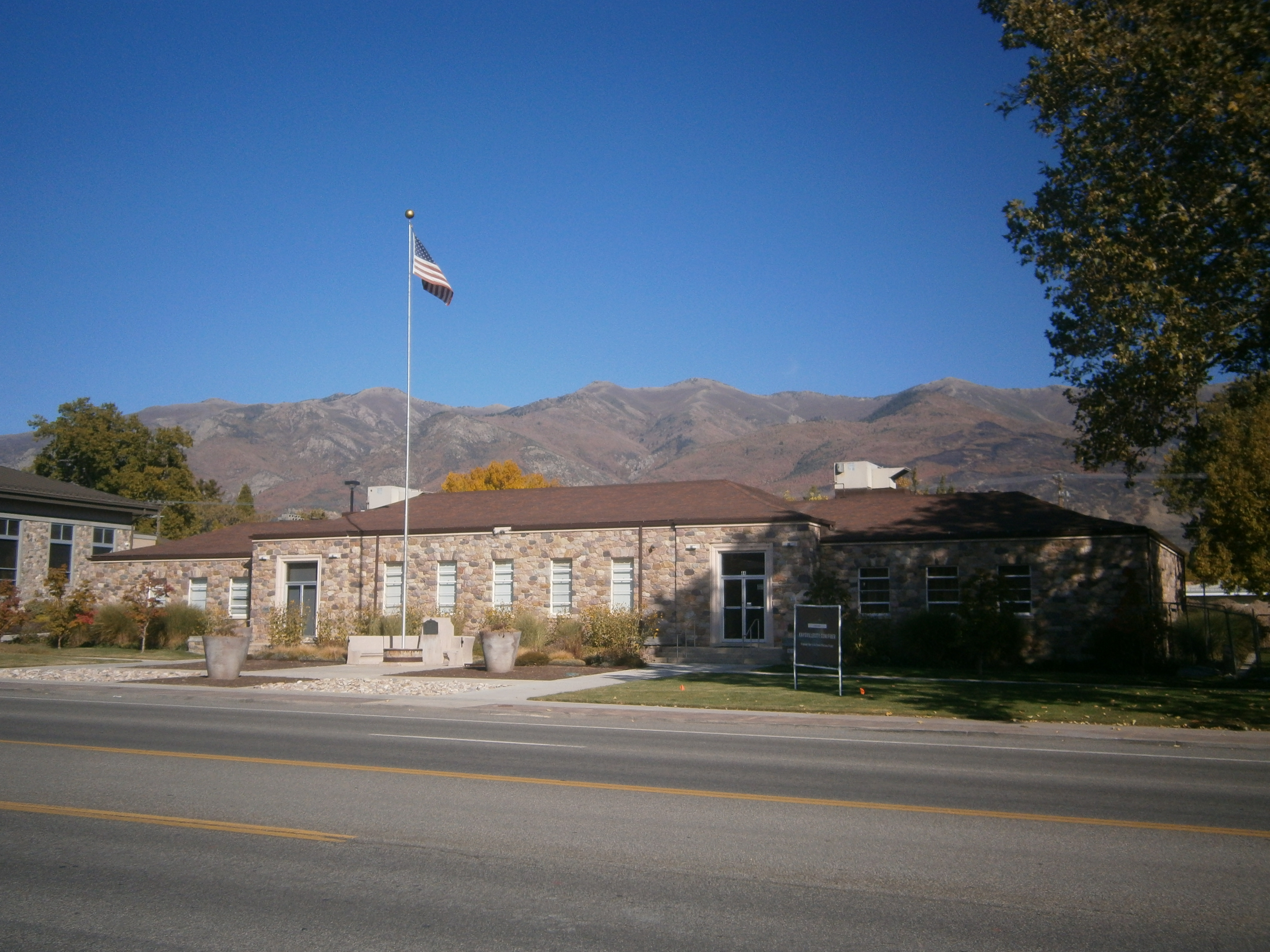

- Location within Utah Location within the United States
- Location: 44 N. Main St., Kaysville, Utah
- Coordinates: 41°02′07″N 111°56′19″W
- Built: 1941-43
- Architect: Ashton & Evans
- NRHP reference No.: 100004476
- Added to NRHP: September 30, 2019

The Kaysville City Hall, also known as Old Kaysville City Hall and the Old Kaysville Library, at 44 N. Main St. in Kaysville, Utah, was listed on the National Register of Historic Places in September 2019.

On November 16, 1940, 25-year-old Mayor Thornley K. Swan announced plans to construct a $55,000 PWA Moderne style city hall building. By the time the bond election was held, the bond amount was reduced to $35,000 because part of the project ($20,000) would be paid for by federal funds through the Works Project Administration (WPA).

The WPA was part of the New Deal during the Great Depression that gave men much needed jobs. Building programs were of great importance during the 1930s, and virtually every public building constructed in Utah, including county courthouses, city halls, fire stations, national guard armories, public school buildings, and a variety of others were built under federal programs by one of several agencies, the WPA being one of those. Almost without exception, none of the buildings would have been built when they were without the assistance of the federal government.

Kaysville City Hall was one of 226 buildings constructed in Utah during the 1930s and early 1940s under the Works Progress Administration and other New Deal programs. Of those 226 buildings, 130 are still standing and retain their integrity. In Davis County, a total of five buildings were constructed. The Old Kaysville City Hall or Old Kaysville Library is the only one that remains.

In 1986, the new Kaysville Municipal Center was built. The library expanded into the newly renovated building in 1987, along with the LeConte Stewart art gallery. In 2006, Davis County took over the operation of the Kaysville library, and moved to its current location at 215 North Fairfield Road in 2014. The Old Kaysville City Hall is currently vacant awaiting a new use.

Today, there are only 6 buildings in Kaysville on the National Register of Historic Places. The Old Kaysville City Hall or Old Kaysville Library is the only Publicly owned building on that list.
