= Springville High School Mechanical Arts Building =

- U.S. National Register of Historic Places
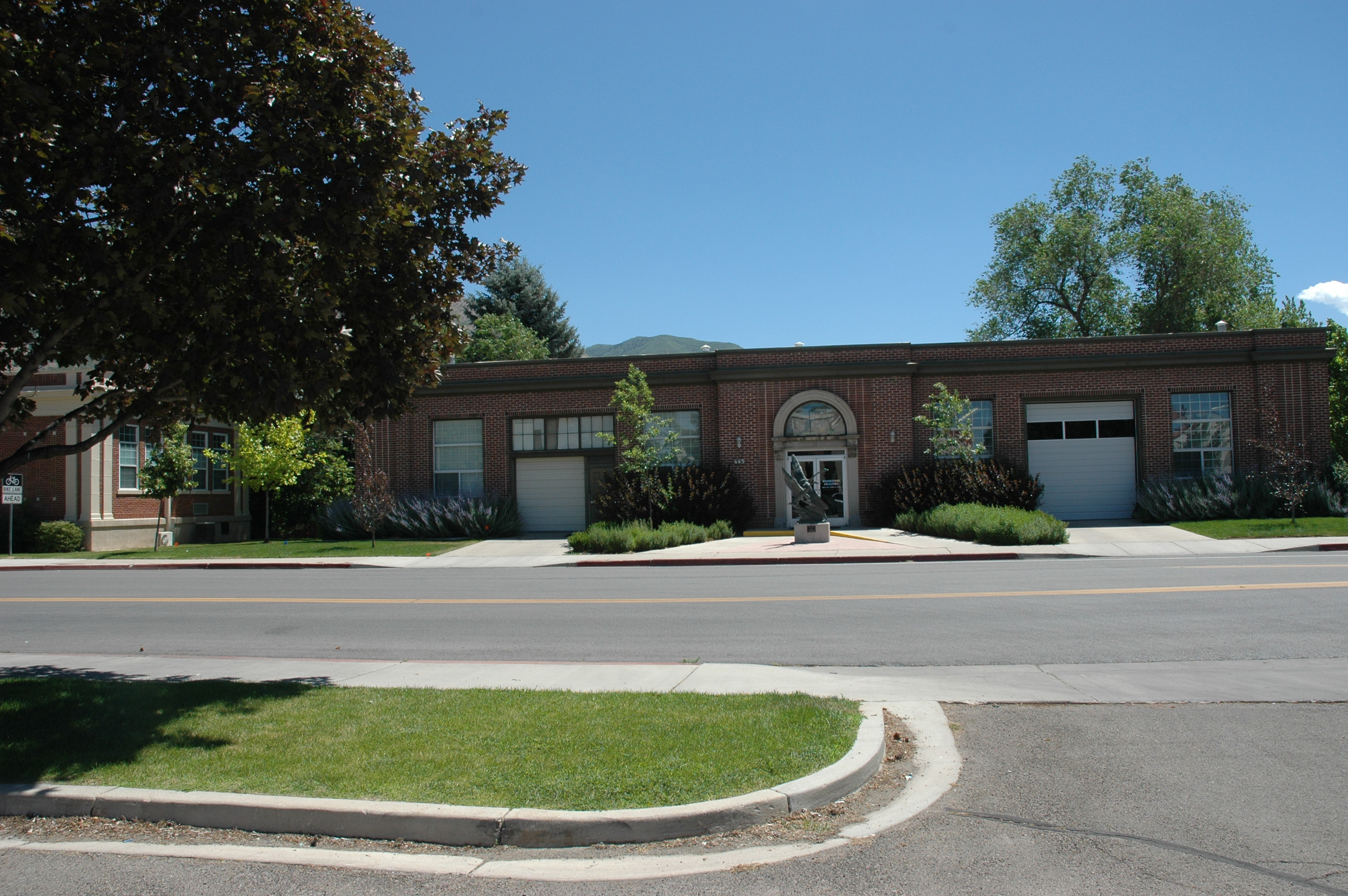

- Location within Utah Location within the United States
- Location: 443 S. 200 East, Springville, Utah
- Coordinates: 40°9′37″N 111°36′22″W
- Area: 0.5 acres (0.20 ha)
- Built: 1929
- Architect: Ashton & Evans
- Architectural style: Classical Revival
- NRHP reference No.: 93000415
- Added to NRHP: May 14, 1993

The Springville High School Mechanical Arts Building at 443 S. 200 East in Springville, Utah was built in 1929. It was listed on the National Register of Historic Places in 1993.

It was an addition to the campus of the Springville High School whose original building had been built in 1909. According to its 1993 NRHP nomination, it is significant historically "as a noteworthy example of the 'mechanical arts' building type that became important to the curriculum of high schools throughout the state during the early Twentieth Century. It is a physical representation in Springville of the Smith-Hughes Act of Congress which was passed in 1917 to establish and foster high school training in the trades, home economics, and vocational agriculture."

It was vacant from 1960 to 1986; from 1986 to 1993 it had been used by the city's arts council.

It is one of five mechanical arts buildings listed on the National Register in Utah. The other four are:

- Morgan High School Mechanical Arts Building (1936), Morgan, Utah
- Moroni High School Mechanical Arts Building (1935–36), Moroni, Utah
- Mount Pleasant High School Mechanical Arts Building (1935–36), Mount Pleasant, Utah
- Park City High School Mechanical Arts Building (1935–36), Park City, Utah
