= Riverton Elementary School =

- U.S. National Register of Historic Places
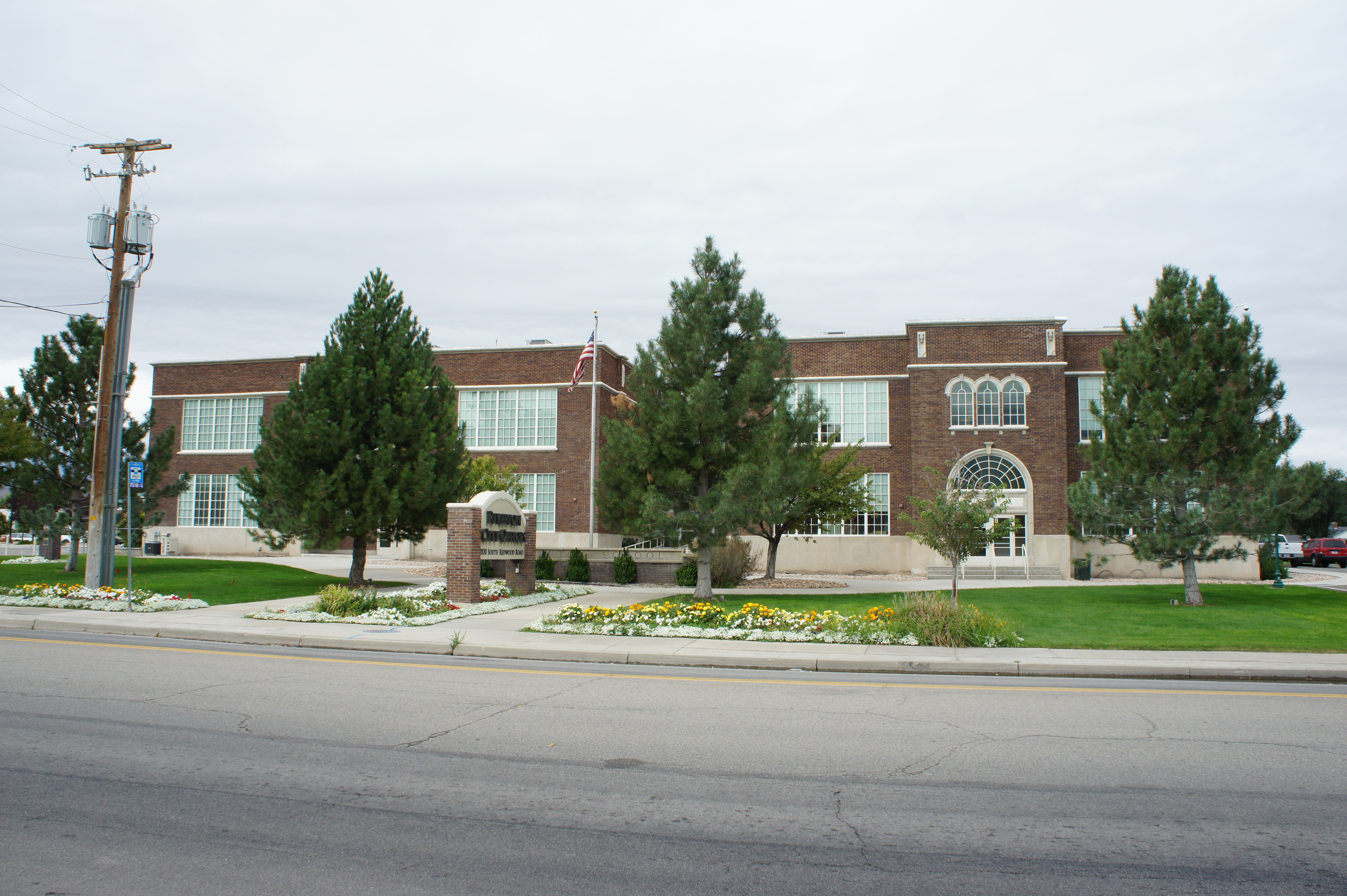

- Location within Utah Location within the United States
- Location: 12830 S. Redwood Rd., Riverton, Utah
- Coordinates: 40°31′6″N 111°56′22″W
- Area: less than one acre
- Built: 1925-30
- Architect: Scott & Welch; Ashton & Evans
- NRHP reference No.: 96000872
- Added to NRHP: August 8, 1996

The Riverton Elementary School, at 12830 S. Redwood Rd. in Riverton, Utah, was built during 1925-30 and is the oldest public school building surviving in Riverton. According to its NRHP nomination in 1996, it is significant historically as representing "the adaptation of schools to meet the needs associated with providing appropriately sized and wholesomely designed spaces in which children could be taught," and for its long service in the community of Riverton.

It was listed on the National Register of Historic Places in 1996.

It now houses the Riverton City Office.
