= Nielsen Fieldhouse =

Arena on University of Utah campus in Salt Lake City, Utah

Coordinates: 40.761°N 111.849°W

Einar Nielsen Fieldhouse
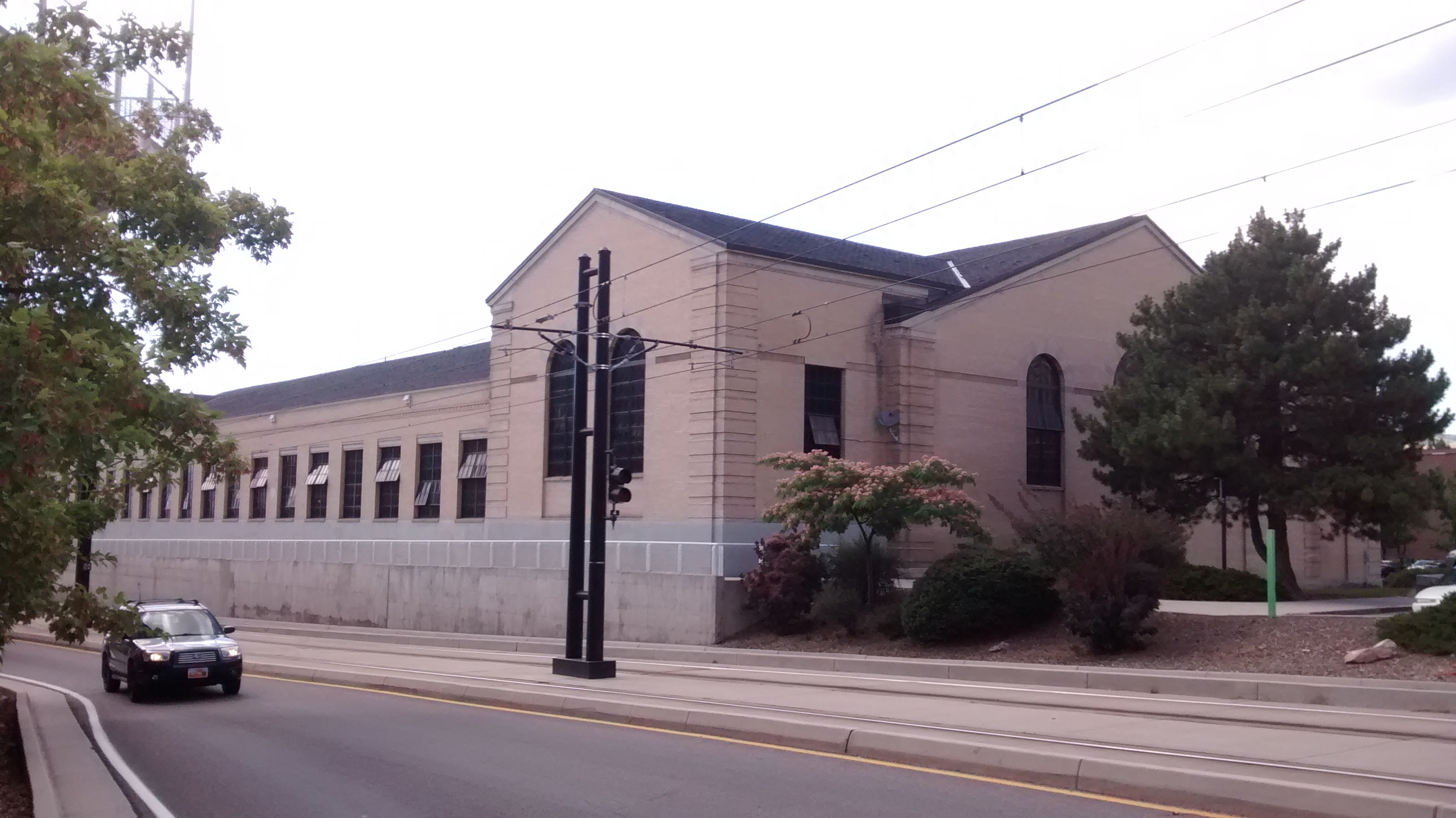
- Southeast corner from Campus Drive in 2014
- Interactive map of Einar Nielsen Fieldhouse
- Former names: Ute Fieldhouse
- Location: S. Campus Drive; Salt Lake City, Utah, U.S.
- Owner: University of Utah
- Operator: University of Utah
- Capacity: 4,000

Construction
- Opened: September 12, 1939
- Cost: $175,000
- Architect: Ashton & Evans

Tenant
- Utah Utes (NCAA)

The Einar Nielsen Fieldhouse is a multi-purpose arena in the western United States, located in Salt Lake City, Utah. Opened 87 years ago in 1939 on the University of Utah campus, it was the home venue of Utes basketball for thirty years, and was formally dedicated on the night of Tuesday, January 9, 1940.

The fieldhouse hosted a pair of first round games of the 23-team NCAA tournament in 1968, and high school basketball state tournaments. It was succeeded as the primary indoor venue on campus by the Jon M. Huntsman Center, which opened in late 1969 as the Special Events Center.

In 1951, David Orton Maxfield completed the sculpture "Teamwork", depicting three football players in the midst of a play, as part of the completion of his Master of Arts degree at Utah. The school's head football coach Jack Curtice consulted on the authenticity of the action and uniforms. The sculpture was installed on the west side of Nielsen Fieldhouse, where it remains to this day.

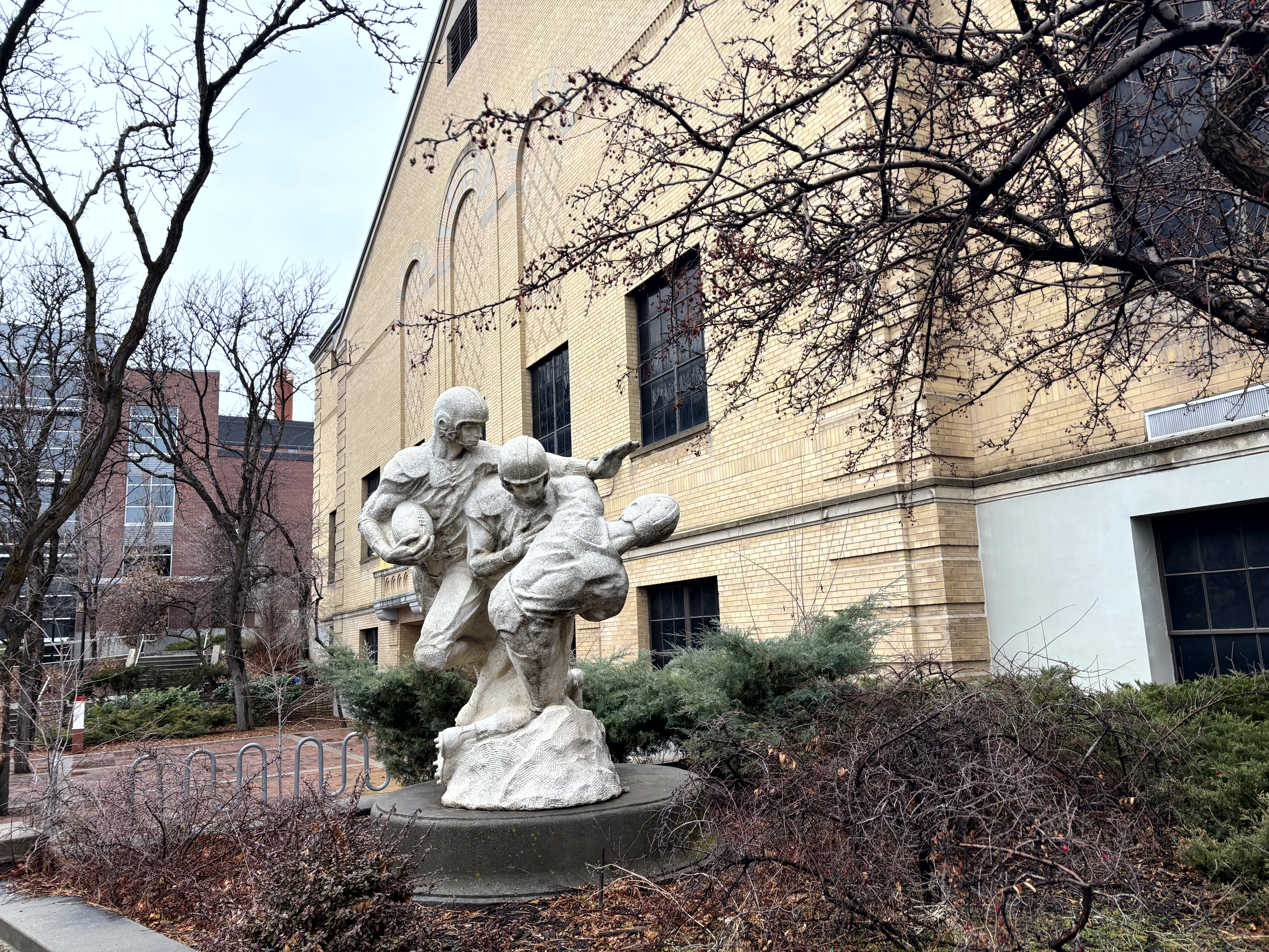
"Teamwork" by David Orton Maxfield outside Nielsen Fieldhouse

The building served as a fitness and recreation center for students and staff at the university for many years, but now acts as a studio for students in the "pre-programs" for Multidisciplinary Design and Architecture, and houses the Meldrum Theatre. A new theatrical space occupied by Pioneer Theatre Company, and The University of Utah's Department of Theatre respectively.

It is located in the southwest portion of campus, just north of Rice–Eccles Stadium, separated by Campus Drive. The approximate elevation at street level is 4,650 feet (1,415 m) above sea level.
