= Frederick W. Keith =

American architect

Frederick W Keith
- Born: 1879; Iowa
- Occupation: Architect
- Practice: F. W. Keith, Keith & Kurke
- Buildings: Indianola Public Library, Bismarck Public Library, Gillette Hall, Beulah School, Liberty Memorial Building

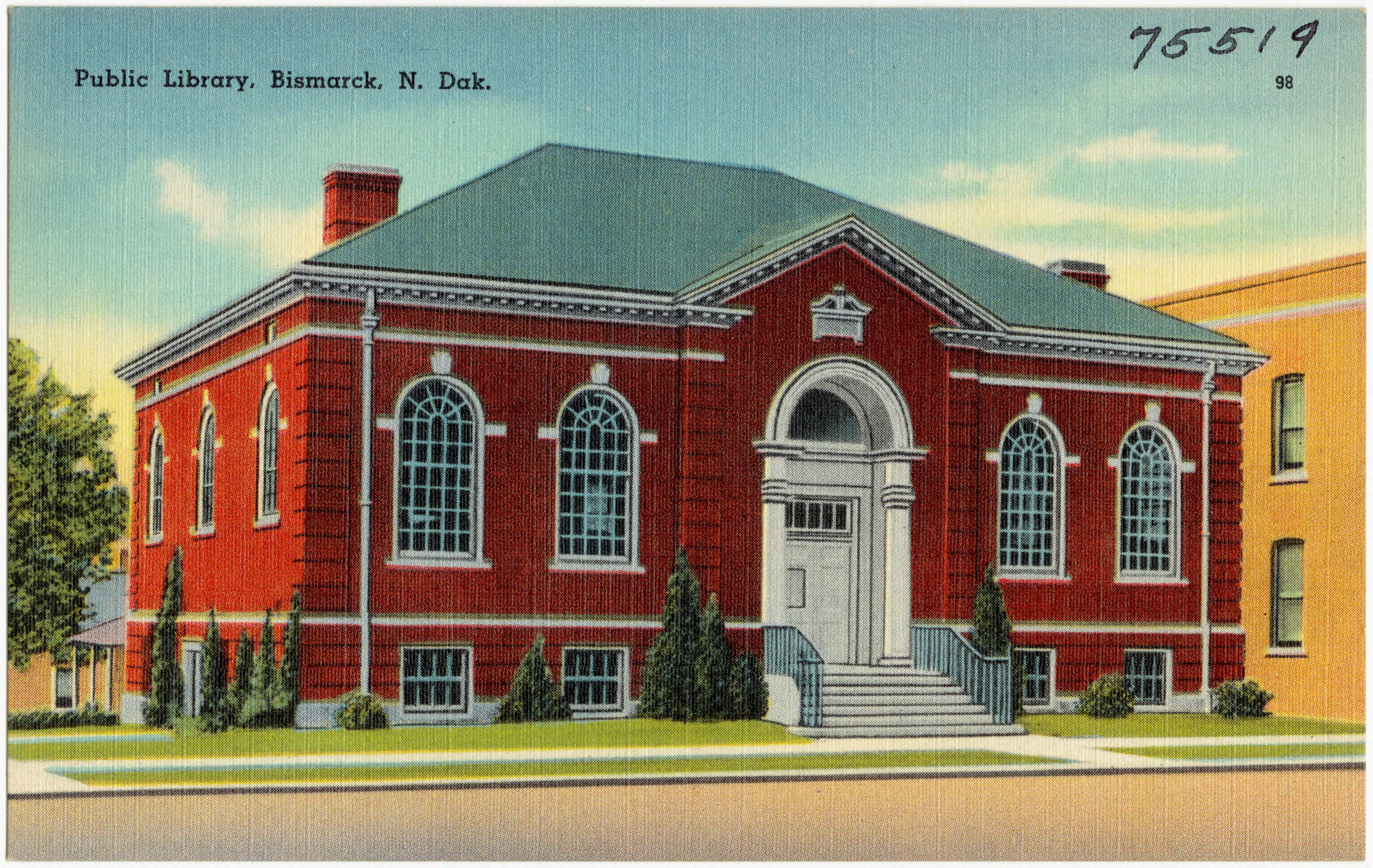
Public Library, Bismarck, 1917.

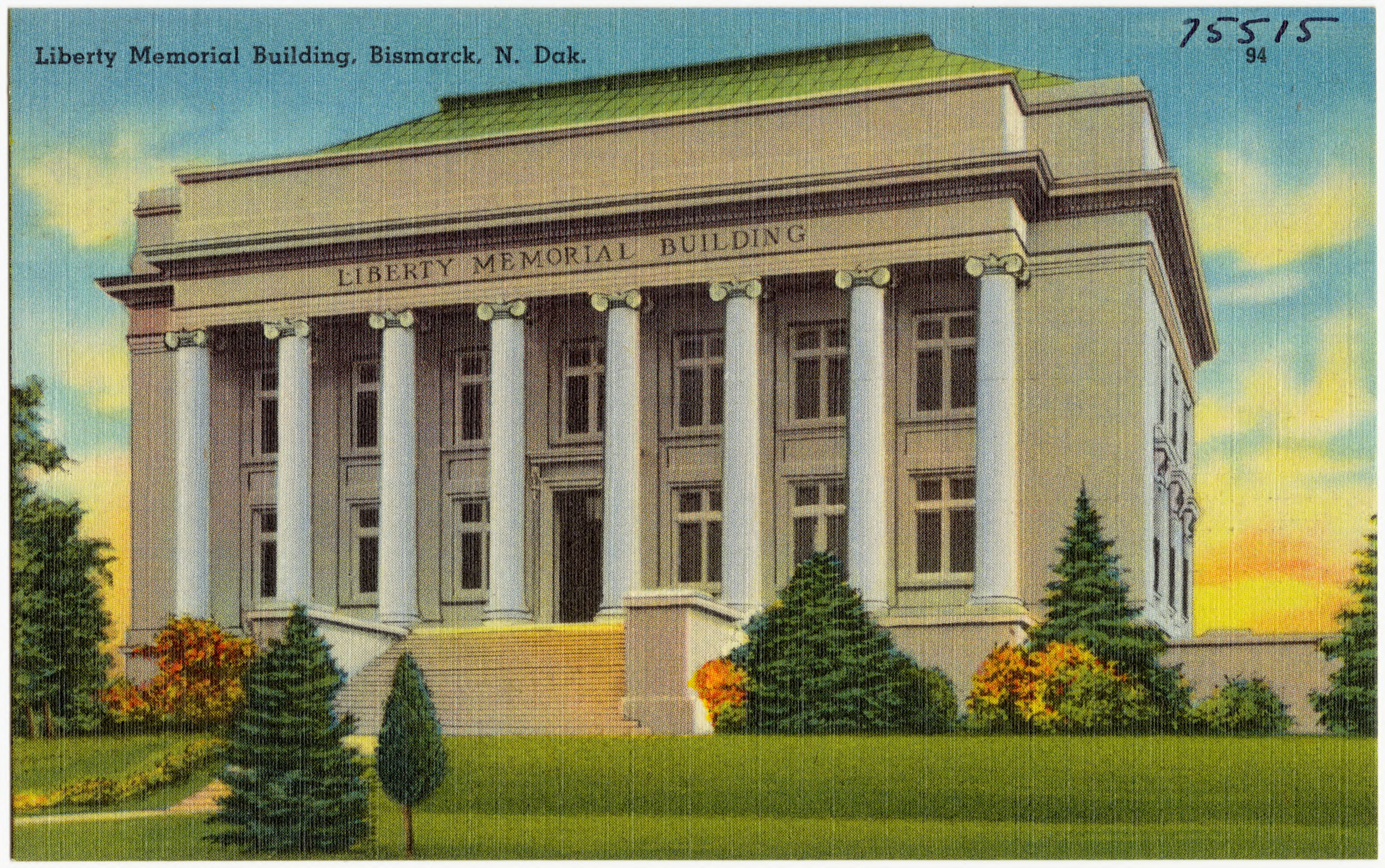
Liberty Memorial Building, Bismarck, 1920.

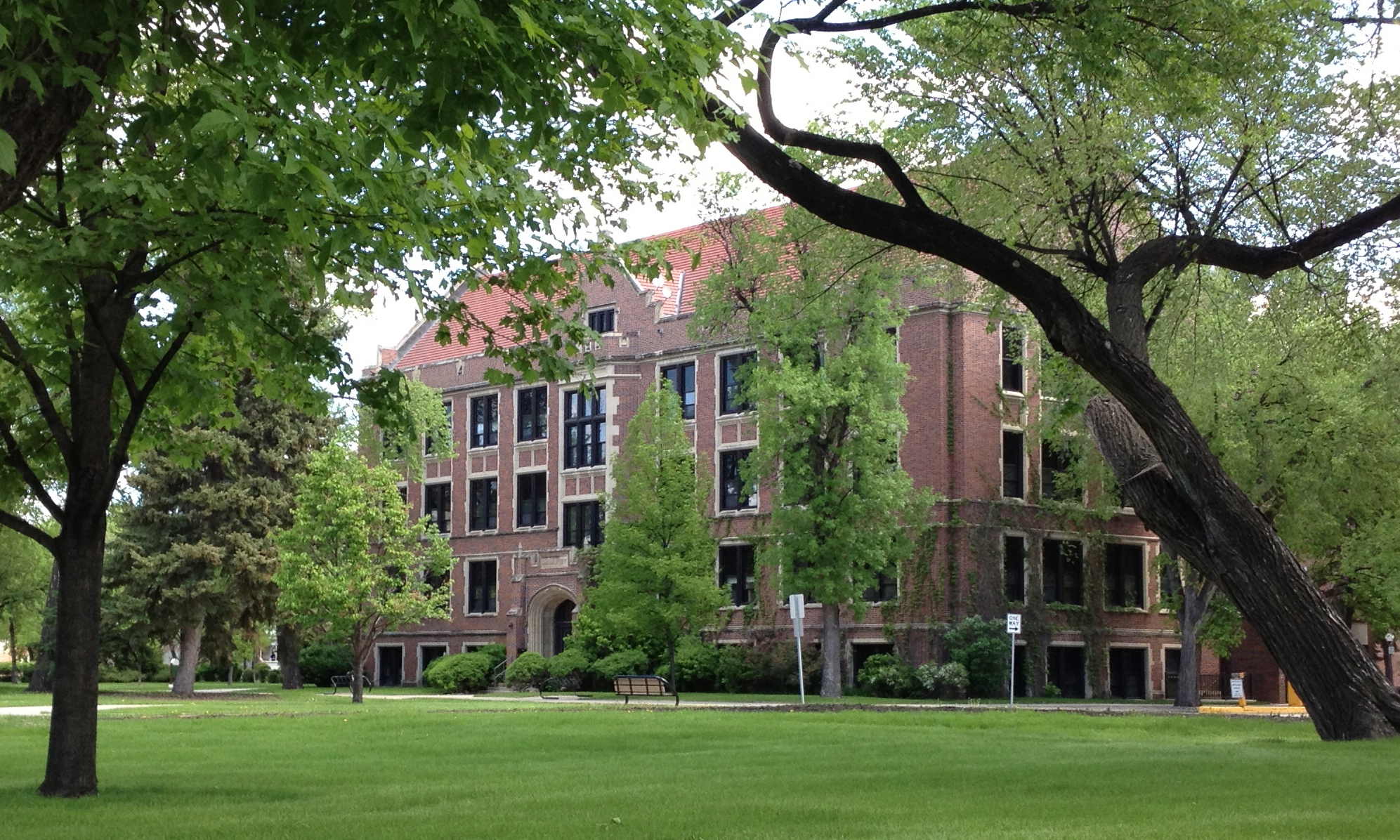
School of Law, University of North Dakota, 1922.

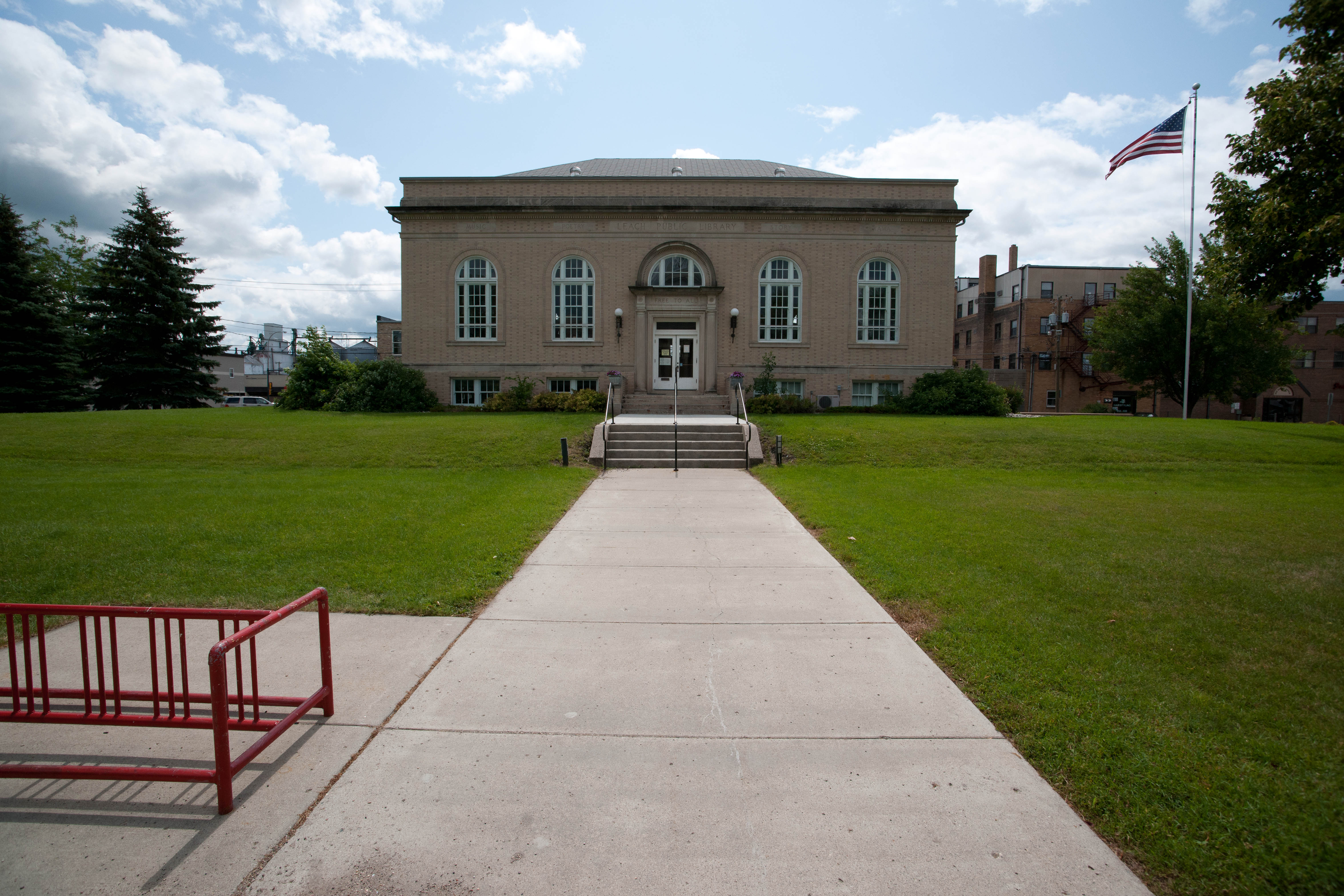
Leach Public Library, Wahpeton, 1923.

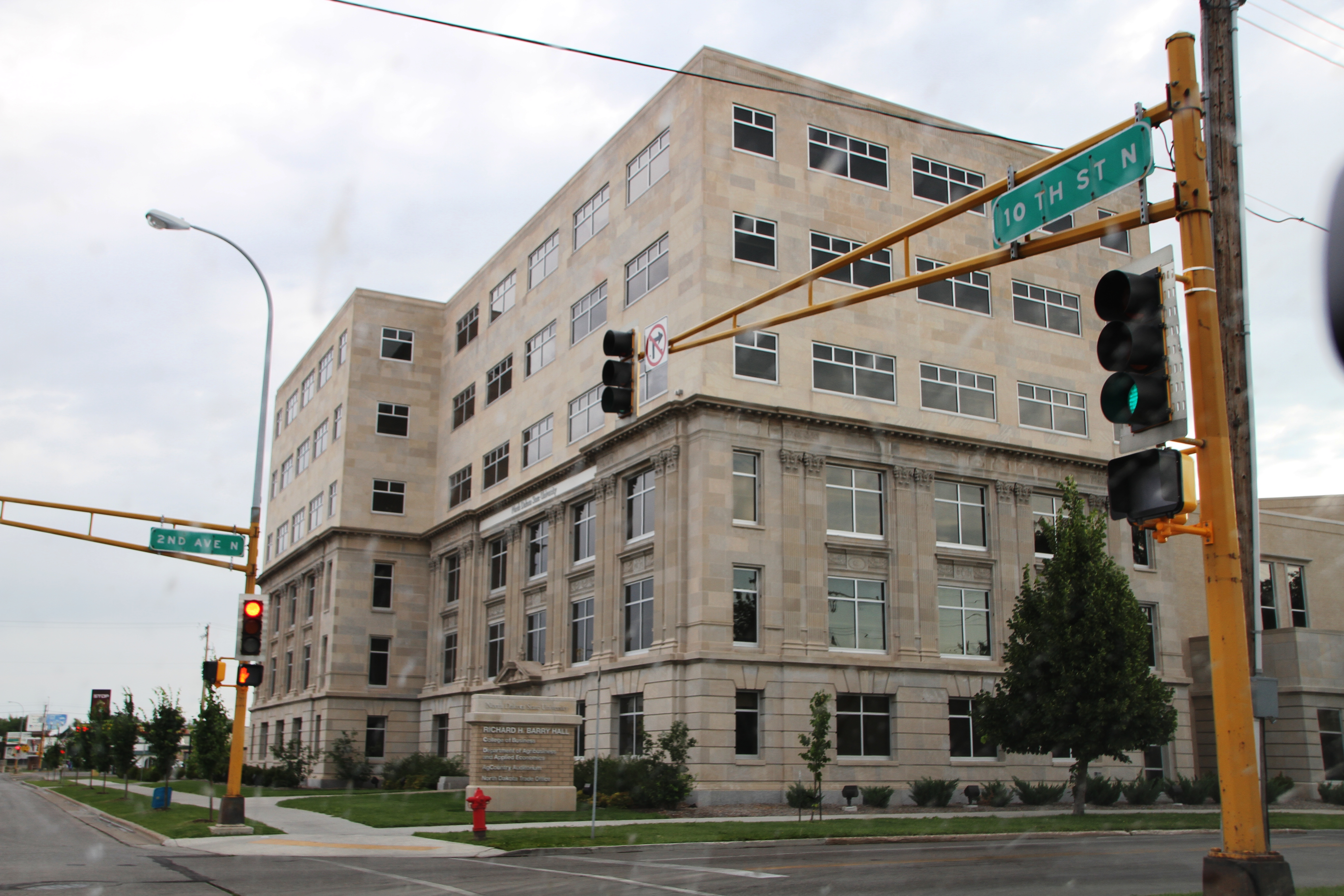
A. O. U. W. Building, Fargo, 1925.

Frederick W. Keith (1879-1954) was an American architect, beginning his career in Indianola, Iowa but gaining prominence while practicing in Grand Forks, Bismarck, and Fargo, North Dakota. After a successful independent practice, he joined forces with William F. Kurke as Keith & Kurke.

== Life ==
Frederick Keith was born in Iowa in 1879, worked as an art professor for Simpson College, Indianola, Iowa, where he designed an auditorium that was never built. He married Eulah Goodhue of Indianola on January 15, 1902 and they had a son in December 1902. After the Carnegie Foundation awarded $10,000 to Indianola, Keith partnered with a local contractor named W.J. Beymer and they opened an architectural firm in order to submit a bid for the design and construction of Indianola's free public library. The short-lived firm of Beymer & Smith submitted the lowest of six bids and built Indianola's Carnegie using local craftsmen and suppliers. Keith, his wife and son left Indianola around 1905. He worked as designer and draftsman for Chicago architect Jarvis Hunt until 1914, when he went to Grand Forks. There, he worked for William J. Edwards, a prominent local designer. In December 1915 he established an office in Grand Forks for himself. In June 1916 he went west to Bismarck, the city with which he is most associated. With the exception of a time of graduate work in Chicago from 1918–19, he practiced independently until he associated with Fargo architect William F. Kurke in 1920. Keith & Kurke were the designated state architects, and designed the Liberty Memorial Building in Bismarck as well as many buildings on the campuses of the state schools. Keith & Kurke dissolved in 1926, and Keith returned to Chicago. He died there in 1954.

== Architectural work ==
=== Frederick W. Keith, 1915-1920 ===
- 1903 Indianola Public Library, 106 West Boston, Indianola, Iowa (now owned by the Des Moines Metro Opera)
- 1916- Henry H. Steele House, 103 W Ave B, Bismarck, North Dakota
- 1916 - Wishek City Hall, 21 Centennial St, Wishek, North Dakota
  - Demolished c.2010
- 1917 - Gillette Hall, University of North Dakota, Grand Forks, North Dakota
- 1917 - Bismarck Public Library, 517 E Thayer Ave, Bismarck, North Dakota
  - Demolished
- 1918 - Armory, University of North Dakota, Grand Forks, North Dakota
- 1920 - Beulah School, 202 2nd St NW, Beulah, North Dakota

=== Keith & Kurke, 1920-1926 ===
- 1920 - Liberty Memorial Building, 604 E Boulevard Ave, Bismarck, North Dakota
- 1921 - Stickney Hall, Dickinson State University, Dickinson, North Dakota
- 1922 - May Hall, Dickinson State University, Dickinson, North Dakota
- 1922 - Morrill Hall, North Dakota State University, Fargo, North Dakota
- 1922 - School of Law, University of North Dakota, Grand Forks, North Dakota.]
- 1923 - Graichen Gymnasium, Valley City State University, Valley City, North Dakota
- 1923 - Herbst Dept. Store, 16 Broadway N, Fargo, North Dakota
- 1923 - Leach Public Library, 417 2nd Ave N, Wahpeton, North Dakota
- 1925 - A. O. U. W. Building (Old), 811 2nd Ave N, Fargo, North Dakota
- 1926 - Riley Building, 10 Roberts St N, Fargo, North Dakota
