= Liberty Memorial (disambiguation) =

Liberty Memorial is the former name of the National World War I Museum and Memorial.

It can also refer to:

- Liberty Memorial, Copenhagen, commemorating the abolition of serfdom in Denmark
- Liberty Memorial Building, in Bismarck, North Dakota
- Liberty Memorial Bridge, connecting Bismarck and Mandan, North Dakota
- Shipka Monument, also known as Liberty Memorial, commemorating the liberation of Bulgaria
