= Powers Hotel (Fargo, North Dakota) =

- U.S. National Register of Historic Places
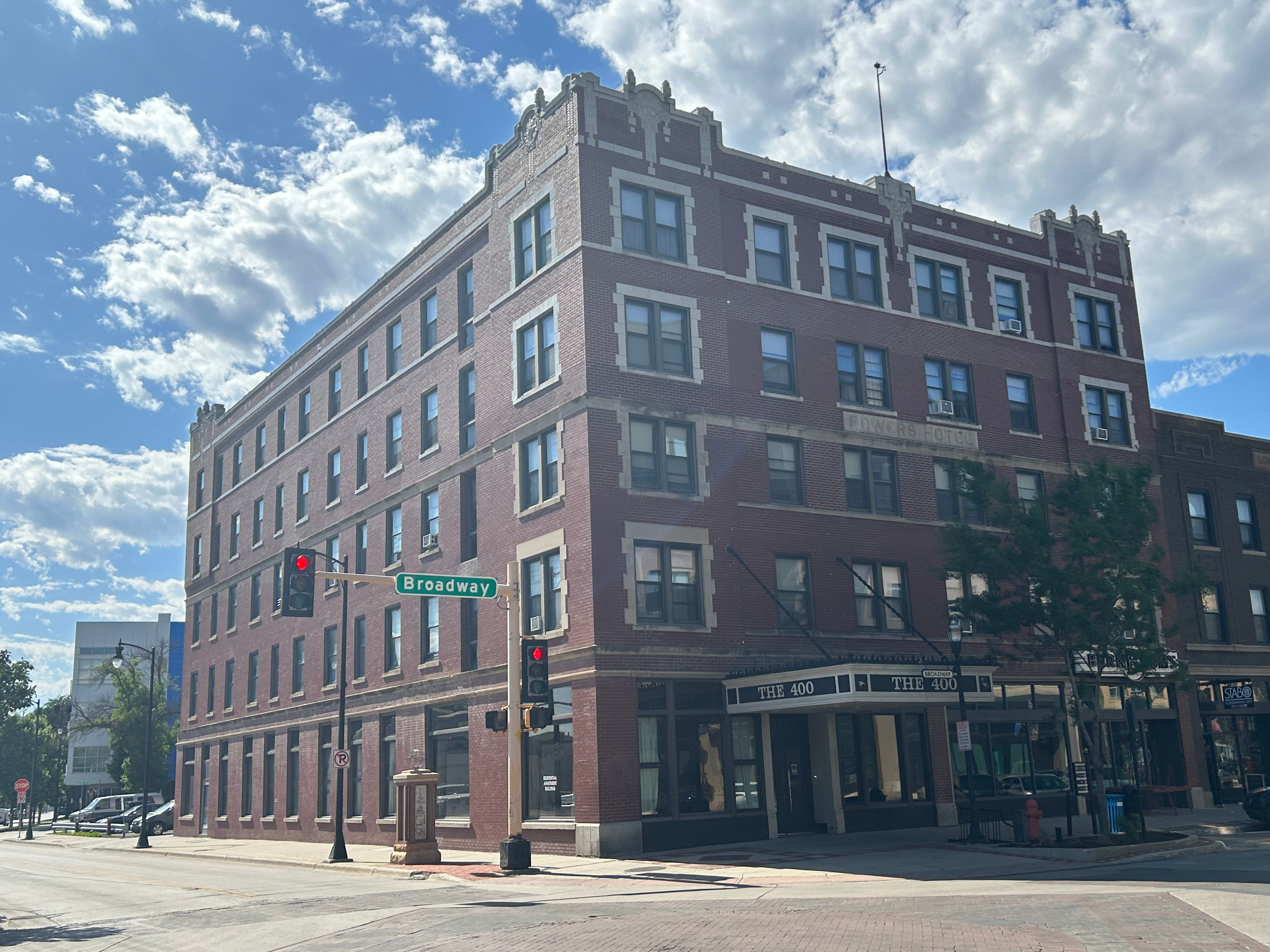

- Location within North Dakota Location within the United States
- Location: 400 Broadway, Fargo, North Dakota
- Coordinates: 46°52′48″N 96°47′16″W
- Built: 1914
- Built by: Powers, T.F.
- Architect: Hancock Brothers & Kurke, William
- Architectural style: Late 19th and Early 20th Century American Movements
- NRHP reference No.: 83001931
- Added to NRHP: May 12, 1983

The Powers Hotel in Fargo, North Dakota, also known as The 400, was built in 1914 by Thomas F. Powers. It was designed by Hancock Brothers and William F. Kurke.

It was listed on the National Register of Historic Places in 1983. and was deemed significant "for its Sullivanesque architectural style as designed by the Hancock Brothers and William F. Kurke", for association with Thomas F. Powers, and, "for its role in the commercial development of North Broadway in Fargo, North Dakota."
