= Old Wishek City Hall =

- Wishek City Hall, Old
- U.S. National Register of Historic Places
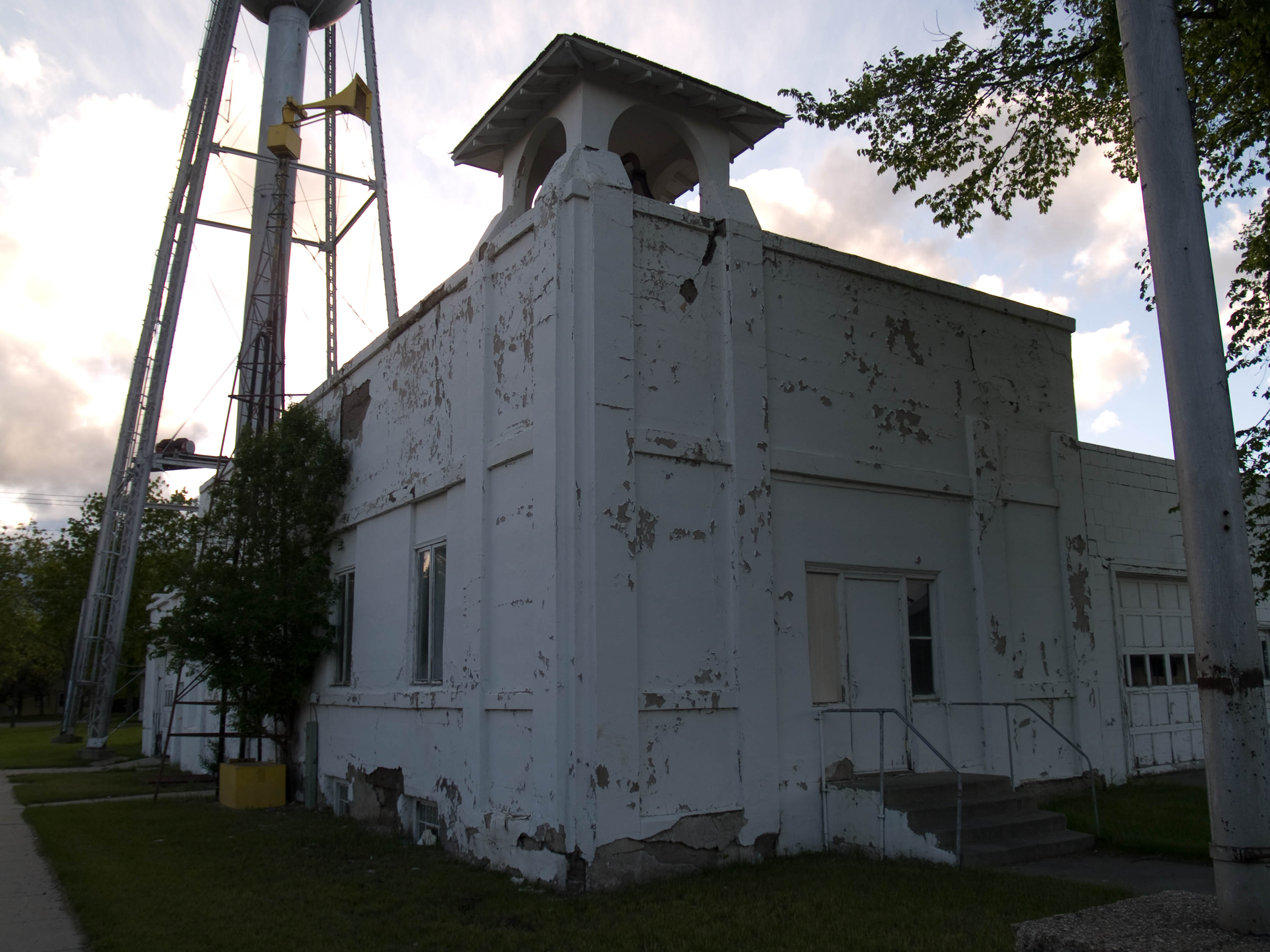

- Location within North Dakota Location within the United States
- Location: 21 Centennial St., Wishek, North Dakota
- Coordinates: 46°15′30″N 99°33′28″W
- Area: less than one acre
- Built: 1916
- Built by: L. H. Jennings
- Architect: Frederick W. Keith
- Architectural style: Mission Revival
- NRHP reference No.: 05001141

Significant dates
- Added to NRHP: October 04, 2005
- Delisted: July 14, 2015

The old Wishek City Hall was a historic building in Wishek, North Dakota. The one-story building was built in 1916 and demolished c. 2011. The Wishek City Council decided in April 2010 to sell the building to the Wishek Heritage Society for restoration. However, they later reversed their decision, believing that restoring the building was too much of a task for the new owner. The Historical Society sued the city, and the outcome of the suit is unknown.
