= Beulah School =

Historic school building in North Dakota, United States

- U.S. National Register of Historic Places
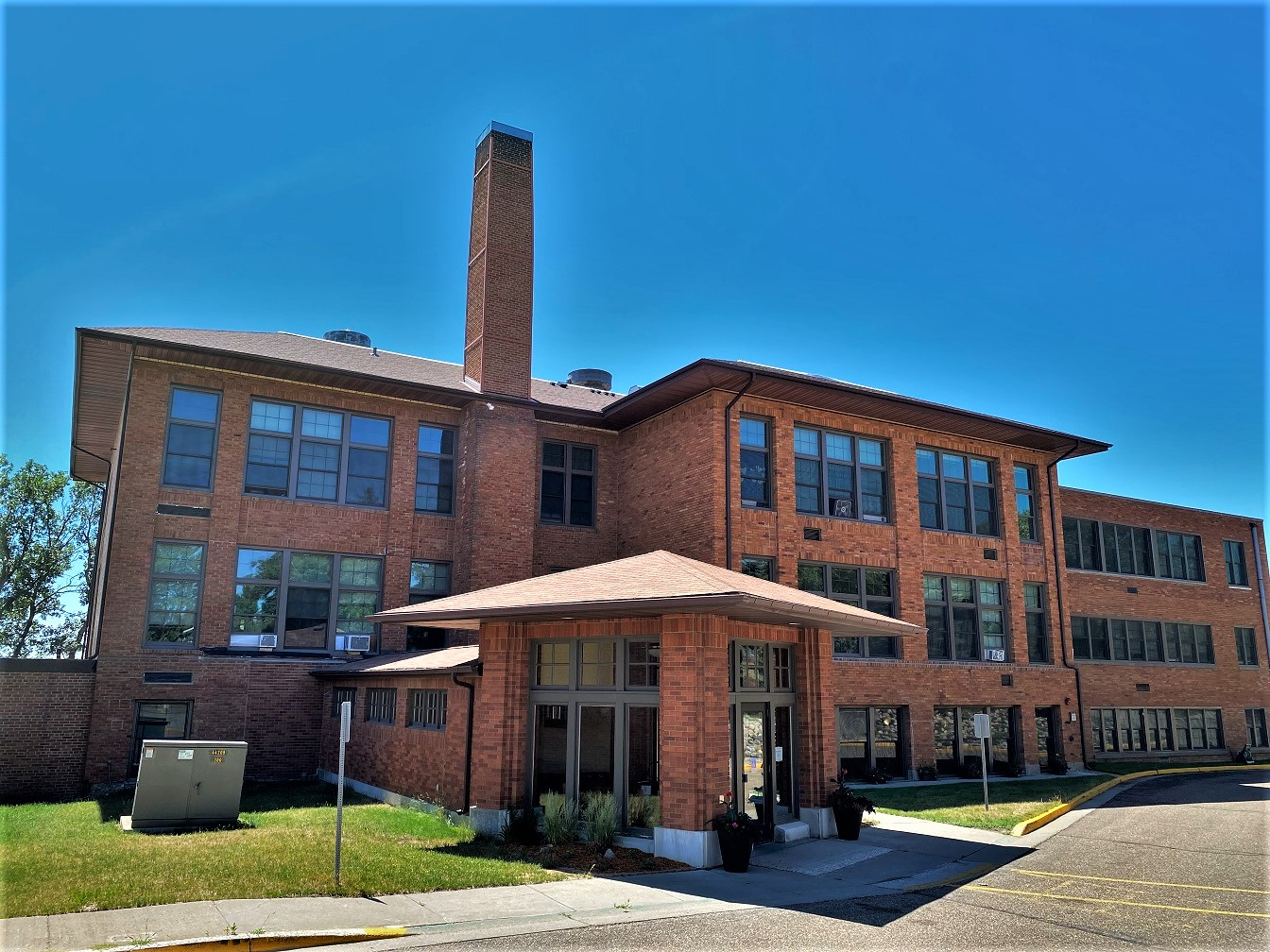
- School house apartments located one block off main street.

- Location within North Dakota Location within the United States
- Location: 205 2nd St., NW; Beulah, North Dakota
- Coordinates: 47°15′54″N 101°46′48″W
- Area: 1.7 acres (0.69 ha)
- Built: 1920
- Architect: Frederick W. Keith; Herman M. Leonhard
- Architectural style: International Style, Prairie School
- NRHP reference No.: 97001200
- Added to NRHP: September 30, 1997

The Beulah School on 2nd St., NW, in Beulah, North Dakota was built in 1920. It has also been known as Beulah High School and as Beulah Middle School. It includes elements of International Style and Prairie School architecture.

It is a work of Frederick W. Keith and Herman M. Leonhard, both architects of Bismarck.

It was listed on the National Register of Historic Places (NRHP) in 1997. The listing included one contributing building and one other contributing site on 1.7 acres (0.69 ha).

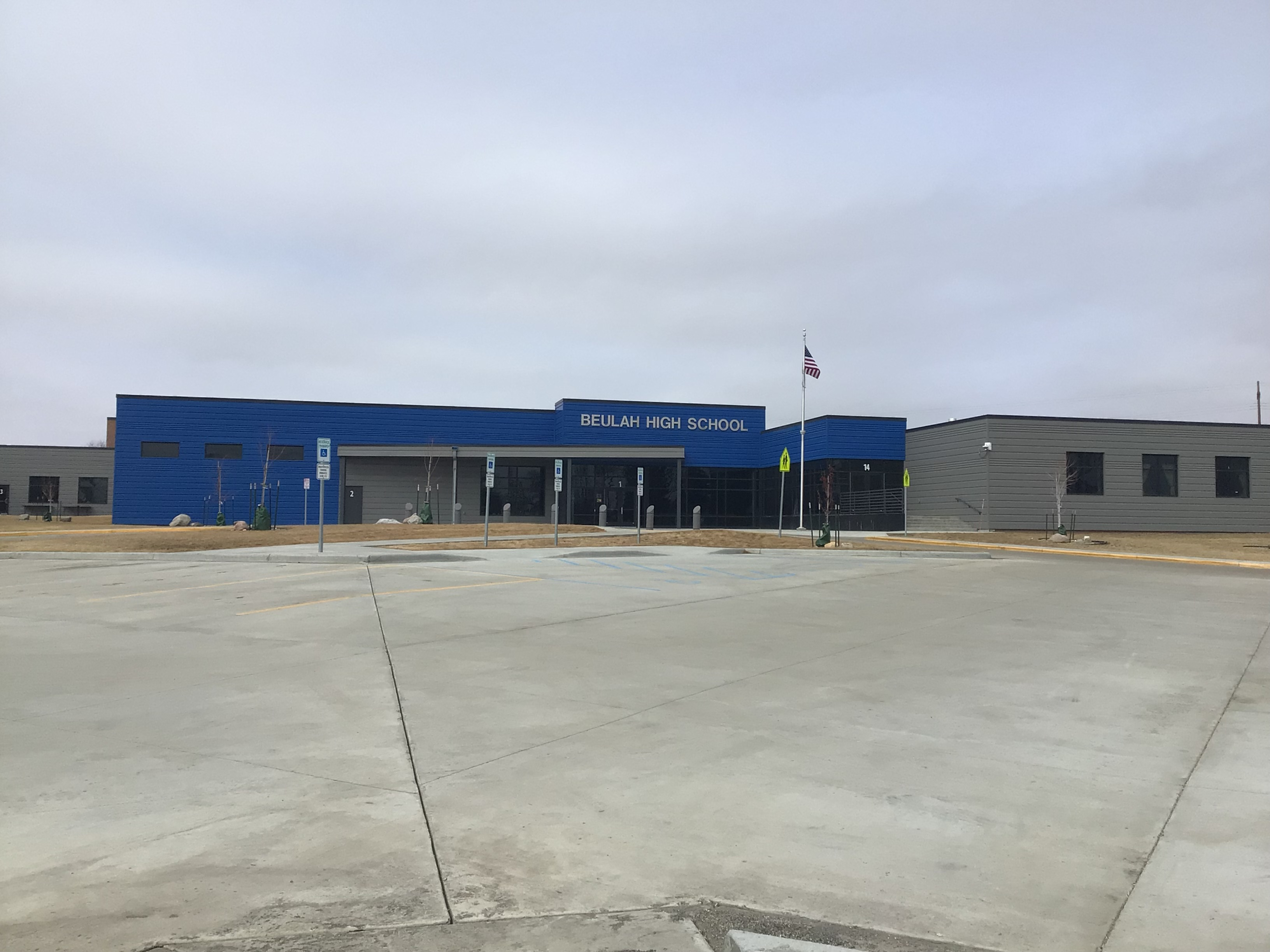
The Beulah High School as of 2025

According to its NRHP nomination, the Beulah School is significant architecturally "as the only Prairie School style building in Beulah and for its International style architecture....[and also is significant] in the area of education as an important building associated with the growth and development of Beulah and the need to provide adequate educational opportunities for its residents. Lastly, the rip rapping and terracing present at the school site is...[significant] in the area of landscape architecture as an important Federal relief project for Beulah."
