= Hettinger County Courthouse =

- U.S. National Register of Historic Places
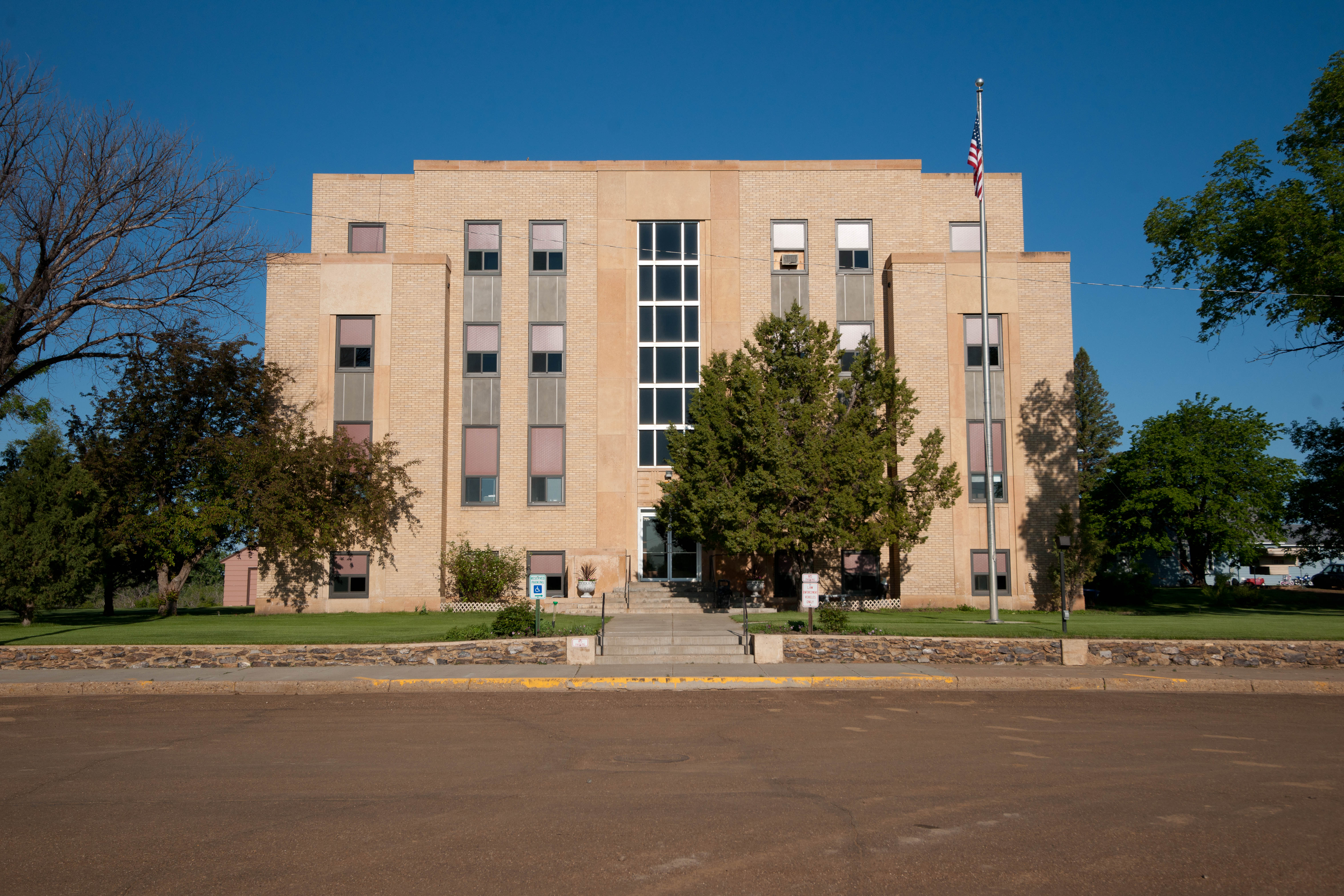

- Location within North Dakota Location within the United States
- Interactive map showing the location of Hettinger County Courthouse
- Location: 336 Pacific St., Mott, North Dakota
- Coordinates: 46°22′29″N 102°19′43″W
- Area: less than one acre
- Built: 1934-36
- Built by: Weinberger, A.J.
- Architect: Ritterbush Bros.
- Architectural style: Art Deco
- MPS: North Dakota County Courthouses TR
- NRHP reference No.: 85002984
- Added to NRHP: November 14, 1985

The Hettinger County Courthouse in Mott, North Dakota was built in 1934. It was listed on the National Register of Historic Places in 1985.

Its construction, during 1934–36, was barely allowed by passage of a bond issue to take advantage of a Public Works Administration grant.

It is significant for its Art Deco architecture, along with that of the Stark County Courthouse.
