= Union Storage & Transfer Cold Storage Warehouse and Armour Creamery Building =

- U.S. National Register of Historic Places
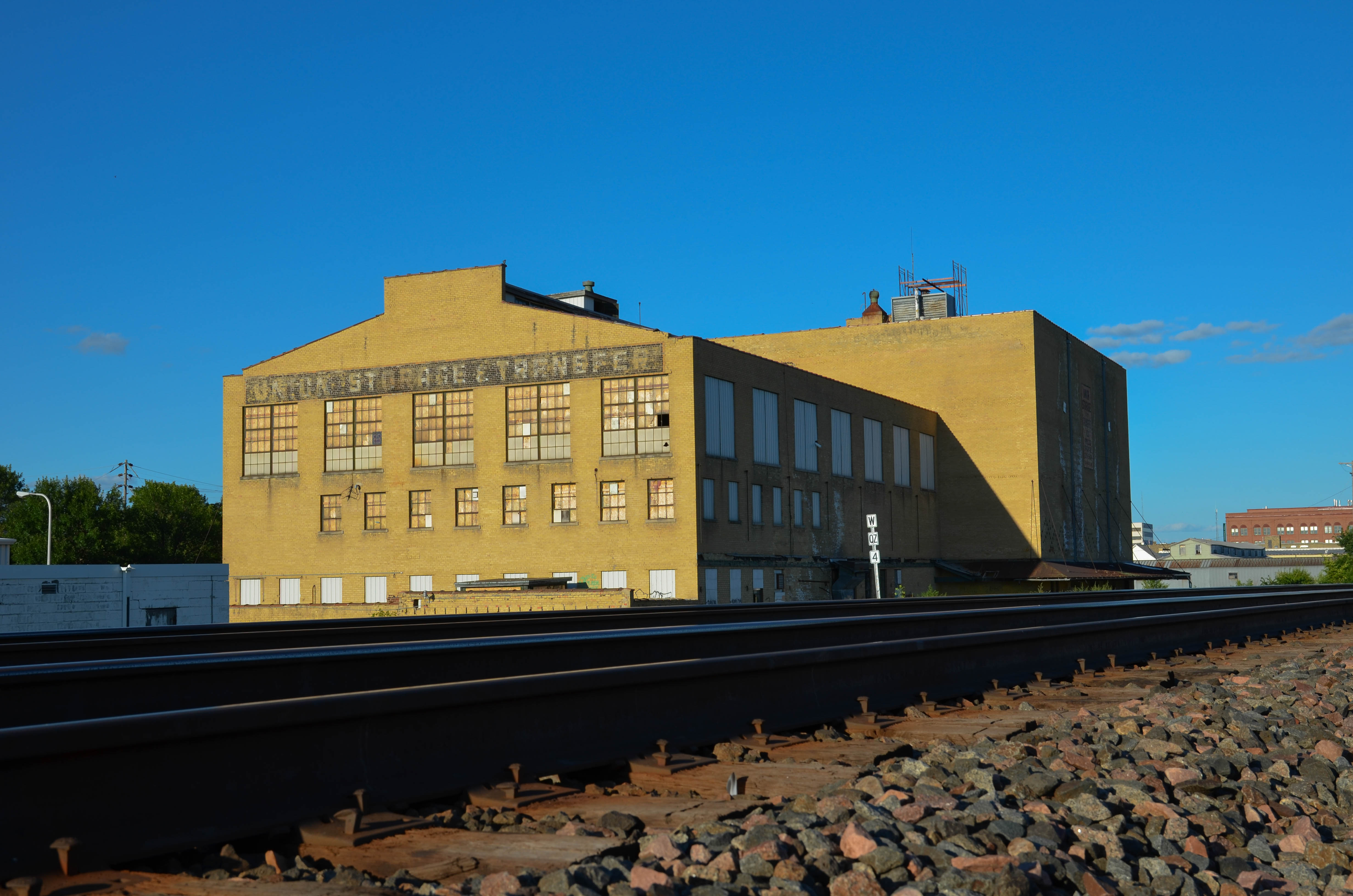

- Location within North Dakota Location within the United States
- Location: 1026-1032 Northern Pacific Ave. and 1034-1102 Northern Pacific Ave., Fargo, North Dakota
- Coordinates: 46°52′36″N 96°47′43″W
- Area: less than one acre
- Built: 1930
- Architect: Kurke, William F.; et al.
- Architectural style: Art Deco, International Style
- NRHP reference No.: 07000016
- Added to NRHP: February 9, 2007

The Union Storage & Transfer Cold Storage Warehouse and Armour Creamery Building in Fargo, North Dakota, United States, was built in 1930. It includes work by Fargo architect William F. Kurke.
