= Mark Pfeifle =

American presidential advisor (born 1972)

- Born: March 30, 1972 (age 54); Wishek, North Dakota, U.S.
- Occupations: Deputy National Security Advisory for Strategic Communication and Global Outreach National Security Council; Deputy Assistant to the President of the United States

Mark Pfeifle (born March 30, 1972) is an American Communication professional. He was top national security advisor and communicator for President George W. Bush. Pfeifle served as deputy assistant to the president and deputy national security advisor for strategic communications and global outreach at the White House from 2007 to 2009. Pfeifle is the founder and president of Off the Record Strategies, a public relations and strategy company, and he is a blogger for the Huffington Post.

== Early life and education ==
Pfeifle grew up in Wishek, North Dakota. His grandparents, Clark and Marjorie Potter, were publishers of the Cass County Reporter, and his parents, Dave and Pat Pfeifle, published the Traill County Tribune. At age 10, Pfeifle wrote a nine-inch story about the local Mayville-Portland, North Dakota, Babe Ruth and American Legion baseball tournament. He graduated from the University of North Dakota with a degree in communications and was sports editor of the school’s newspaper.

His first professional work was as the manager of the radio station KDRQ Radio AM 1330 in Wishek. Shortly after he became the marketing and advertising director of the Grand Forks Air Force Base newspaper and was a stringer and freelancer for Associated Press and USA Today.

== Career ==
From 1997 to 2001, Pfeifle helped lay the groundwork to elect Bush, by serving as deputy communications director at the Republican National Committee. From 2001 to 2004, as communication director and press secretary for Interior Secretary Gale Norton, Pfeifle created messages to pass energy and conservation legislation and the administration’s Healthy Forest Initiative. While at Interior, he was one of the first communication advisors sent to Ground Zero in New York City following September 11 attacks.

Pfeifle took a second leave from Interior to become communications director for the 2004 Republican National Convention. The convention produced 3400 TV, print, radio and Internet interviews. The event had modest success, with an online operation that attracted more than 40 million web visitors and the first-ever “Bloggers’ Corner” for web journalists, as well as the first-ever daily Spanish-language press briefings at a national convention.

In 2005, Pfeifle directed the Social Security Information Center at the U.S. Department of Treasury, leading the communication effort for the president’s Social Security reforms. Later that year, Pfeifle was assigned to the White House to focus on communication strategy for the war on terror and a short tour as a senior communications advisor for Defense Secretary Robert Gates.

Pfeifle was the principal interagency coordinator for national security outreach and communication strategy from 2007 to the end of the George W. Bush administration. Pfeifle led the effort to promote Bush’s Iraq War troop surge of 2007, including a month-long stint in Baghdad. He worked on international communication initiatives to de-legitimize al Qaeda, to stop Iran from enriching uranium, to denuclearize North Korea, to achieve fair and free trade agreements and to advocate the causes of freedom, liberty and human rights to those suffering under brutal dictatorships.

On January 13, 2009, Fort Leavenworth Commander and former Iraq War spokesman and then-Lt. Gen. William B. Caldwell IV awarded Pfeifle the Army’s Outstanding Civilian Service Award for “dramatically improved communication planning and strategies...in support of the Global War on Terror.”

In the spring of 2009, Pfeifle briefly returned to North Dakota to set up a rapid response effort to help citizens during the Red River Valley flooding near Fargo, ND.

In July 2009, Pfeifle created a stir in the online and tech community when he called for Twitter to be considered for the Nobel Peace Prize for its assistance in helping the people of Iran. Pfeifle wrote in the Christian Science Monitor that "When traditional journalists were forced to leave the country, Twitter became a window for the world to view hope, heroism, and horror. It became the assignment desk, the reporter, and the producer. And, because of this, Twitter and its creators are worthy of being considered for the Nobel Peace Prize."

In May 2012, Pfeifle debated at the Oxford Union on social media and social activism.

In 2016, Pfeifle guided law enforcement communications strategy to discredit water protectors in the Dakota Access Pipeline protests. He would later advise law enforcement at Thacker Pass lithium mine.

In December 2023, Pfeifle delivered the commencement address at his alma mater, the University of North Dakota. Pfeifle told the students: “Help each other. Remember those who gave us a hand along this journey. Say yes to new skills and never stop learning. Expose yourself to ideas you don’t necessarily agree with. Learn from the mistakes you made along the way and be ready for those moments when it all comes together.”
