= William F. Kurke =

American architect (1889–1965)

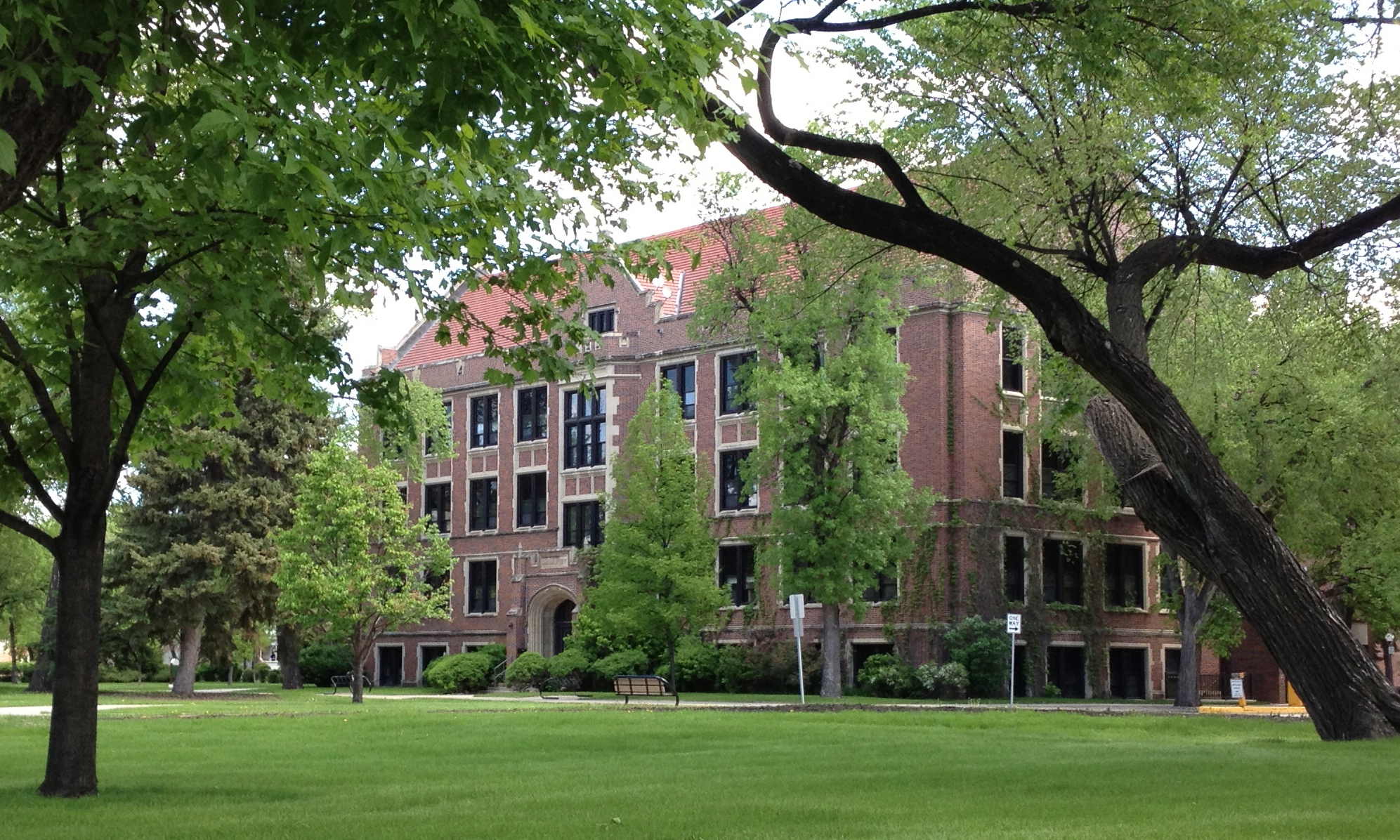
School of Law, University of North Dakota, 1922

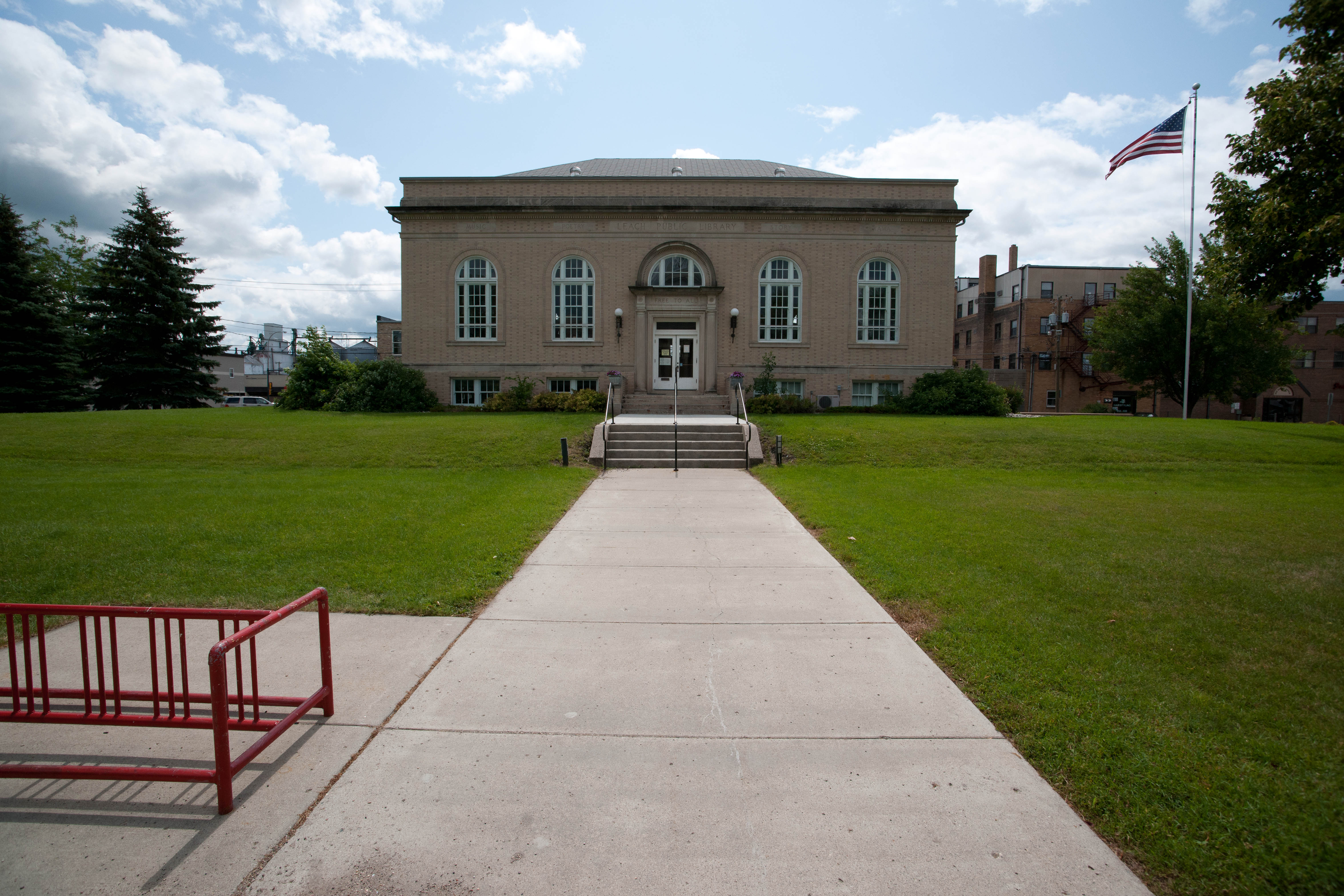
Leach Public Library, Wahpeton, 1923

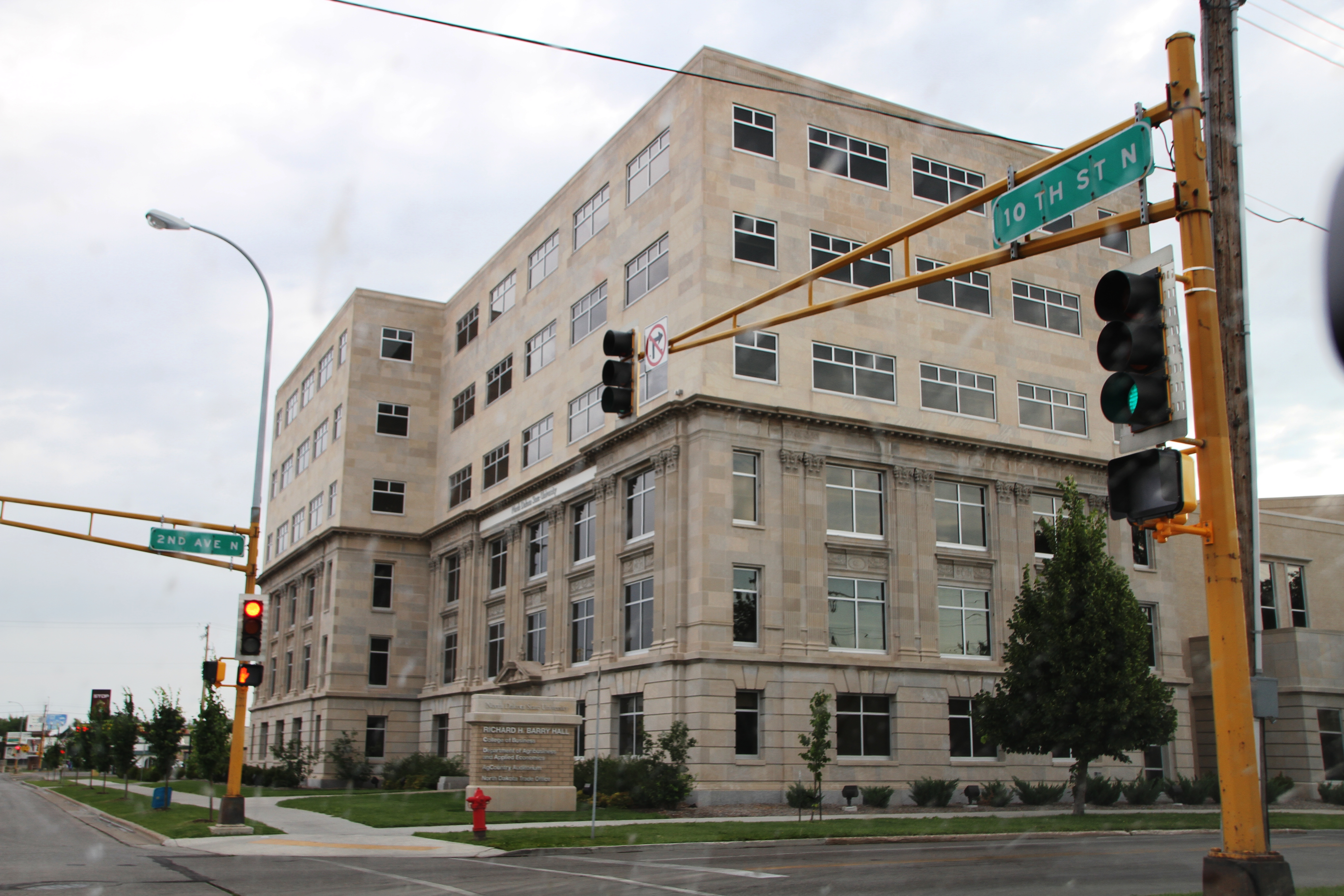
A. O. U. W. Building, Fargo, 1925

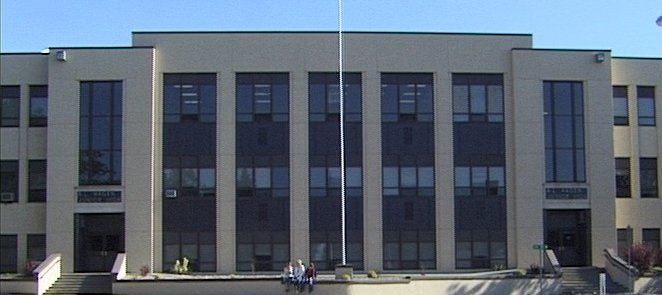
High School, Dickinson, 1933

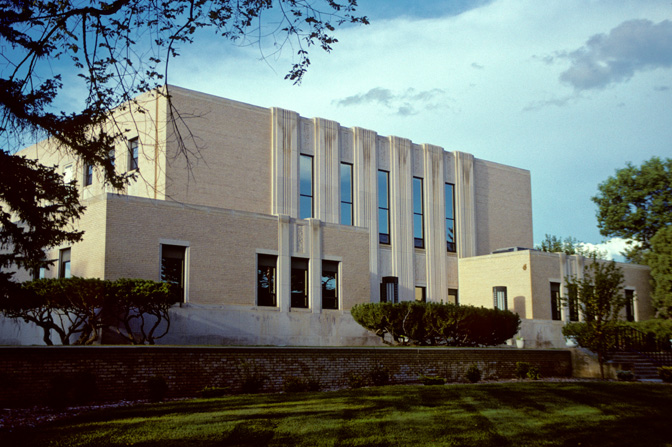
Stark County Courthouse, Dickinson, 1936

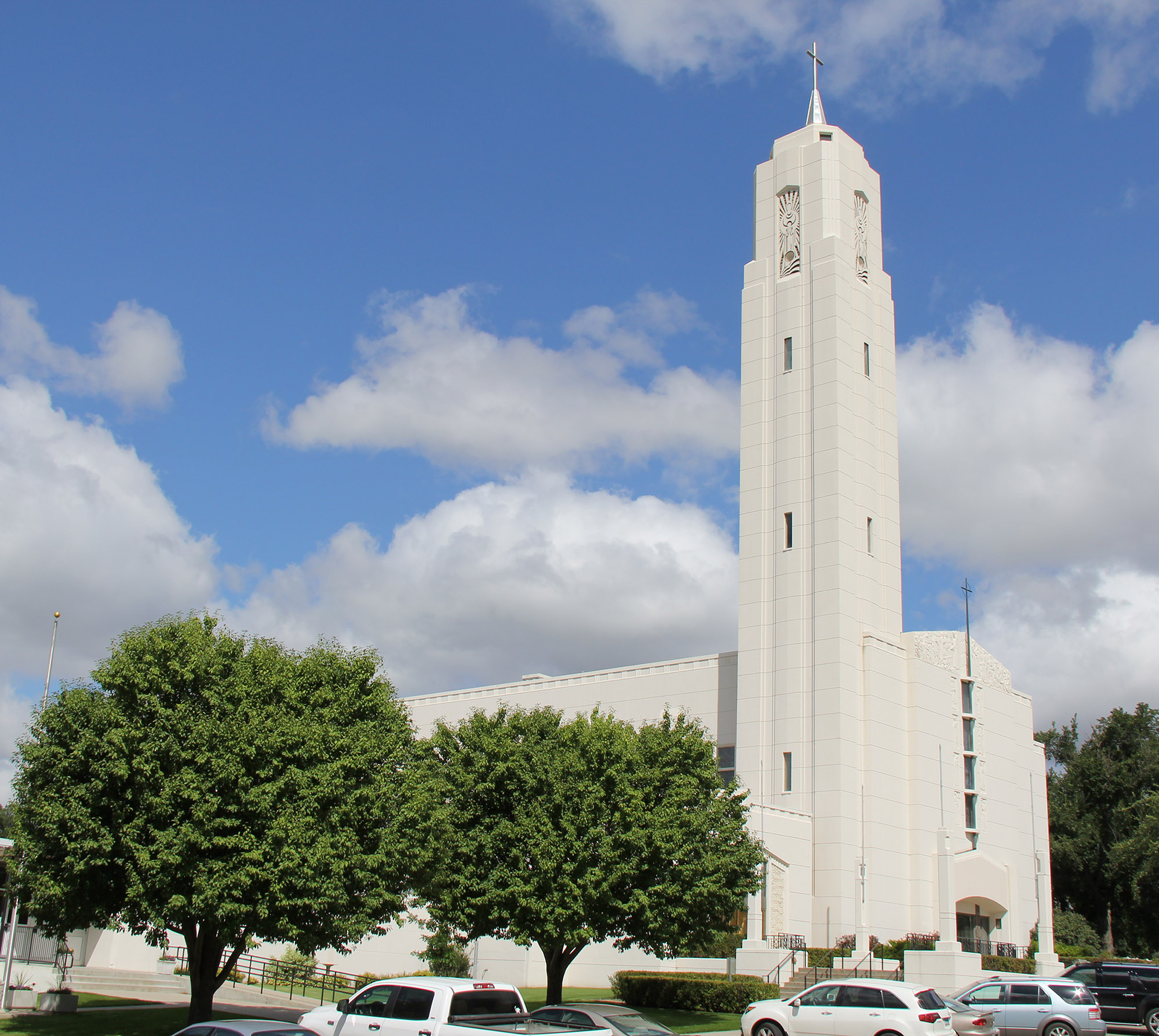
Cathedral of the Holy Spirit, Bismarck, 1942

William F. Kurke (1889–1965) was a prolific architect in North Dakota.

== Early life and education ==
William Kurke was born in Minneapolis on December 9, 1889. He graduated from North High School before attending the University of Minnesota and the University of Pennsylvania.

== Career ==
In 1913 he opened an architect's office in Fargo, where he would remain until his death. He practiced alone until 1920, when he established a partnership with Frederick W. Keith of Bismarck, with offices in both cities. Keith moved to Fargo a few years later, but Keith & Kurke lasted until Keith left the state in 1926. Kurke was again alone until 1946, when his son, John M. Kurke, was admitted to the firm, which became William F. Kurke & Associates. More associates were added in 1952, and the name was reduced to Kurke Associates. William Kurke retired in 1958, and the practice lasted into the 1960s under the leadership of his son.

== Family life and death ==
Kurke died January 17, 1965. He married Elise Pomerleau Kurke (1892–1998) in 1913, they had three children: Robert W. and John M. (1918–2009) and one daughter, Donna Reed. Elise was 105 when she died.

== Legacy ==
According to modern analysis of Kurke, "Keith and Kurke are known statewide for a distinguished body of residential, public and federal works." A number of his works, alone or with partners, are listed on the National Register of Historic Places (NRHP).

== Architectural works ==
William F. Kurke, 1913–1920:

- 1915 - National Bank Building, 418 Dakota Ave., Wahpeton, North Dakota.
- 1917 - Smith, Follet & Crowl Warehouse, 309 Roberts St. N., Fargo, North Dakota.
- 1918 - Equity Building, 113 Roberts St. N., Fargo, North Dakota.
- 1919 - Powers Hotel (Addition), 400 Broadway N., Fargo, North Dakota.

Keith & Kurke, 1920–1926:

- 1920 - Liberty Memorial Building, 604 E. Boulevard Ave., Bismarck, North Dakota.
- 1921 - Stickney Hall, Dickinson State University, Dickinson, North Dakota.
- 1922 - May Hall, Dickinson State University, Dickinson, North Dakota.
- 1922 - Morrill Hall, North Dakota State University, Fargo, North Dakota.
- 1922 - School of Law, University of North Dakota, Grand Forks, North Dakota.
- 1923 - Graichen Gymnasium, Valley City State University, Valley City, North Dakota.
- 1923 - Herbst Dept. Store, 16 Broadway N., Fargo, North Dakota.
- 1923 - Leach Public Library, 417 2nd Ave. N., Wahpeton, North Dakota.
- 1925 - A. O. U. W. Building (Old), 811 2nd Ave. N., Fargo, North Dakota.
- 1926 - Riley Building, 10 Roberts St. N., Fargo, North Dakota.

William F. Kurke, 1926–1946:

- 1928 - Fargo Food Products Warehouse, 503 7th St. N., Fargo, North Dakota.
- 1929 - Ivers Apartments, 324 Roberts St. N., Fargo, North Dakota.
- 1930 - Churchill Hall, North Dakota State University, Fargo, North Dakota.
- 1939 - Union Storage & Transfer Cold Storage Warehouse, 1026–1102 Northern Pacific Ave., Fargo, North Dakota.
- 1931 - North Dakota State Capitol, 600 E. Boulevard Ave., Bismarck, North Dakota. With J. B. DeRemer and Holabird & Root.
- 1933 - Dickinson High School (Old), 4th St. W., Dickinson, North Dakota.
- 1936 - Stark County Courthouse, 51 3rd St. E., Dickinson, North Dakota.
- 1939 - West Fargo Public School (Loeden Center), 3rd St. E., West Fargo, North Dakota.
- 1942 - Cathedral of the Holy Spirit, 519 Raymond St., Bismarck, North Dakota.
- 1945 - Bishop's Residence, 420 Raymond St., Bismarck, North Dakota.

William F. Kurke & Associates: 1946–1952:

- 1947 - North Dakota Veterans' Home, Rose St., Lisbon, North Dakota.
- 1949 - Library, North Dakota State University, Fargo, North Dakota.
- 1950 - Minot Daily News Building, 301 4th St. SE, Minot, North Dakota.
- 1950 - St. Ansgar's Hospital, Park River, North Dakota
- 1951 - Scott Gymnasium, Dickinson State University, Dickinson, North Dakota.
- 1951 - St. Joseph R. C. School, 410 Collins Ave., Mandan, North Dakota.

Kurke Associates, 1952–1960s:

- 1953 - Williams County Courthouse, 205 E. Broadway, Williston, North Dakota.
- 1955 - Traill County Courthouse (Addition), 114 W. Caledonia Ave., Hillsboro, North Dakota.
- 1956 - Minot Air Force Base, Minot, North Dakota.
- 1958 - Fargo Civic Center (City Hall and Memorial Auditorium), 4th St. N., Fargo, North Dakota. Altered, may be demolished.
- 1959 - Arthur High School (Old), 2nd Ave., Arthur, North Dakota.
- 1960 - Carrington High School, 3rd Ave. S., Carrington, North Dakota.
- 1960 - Fargo Biltmore Motor Hotel, 1800 Main Ave., Fargo, North Dakota.
- 1961 - First National Bank Building (Additions), 15 Broadway N., Fargo, North Dakota.
- 1962 - Fidelity Savings and Loan Association Building, 149 4th St, NE, Valley City, North Dakota.
