= Indianola Carnegie Library =

- U.S. National Register of Historic Places
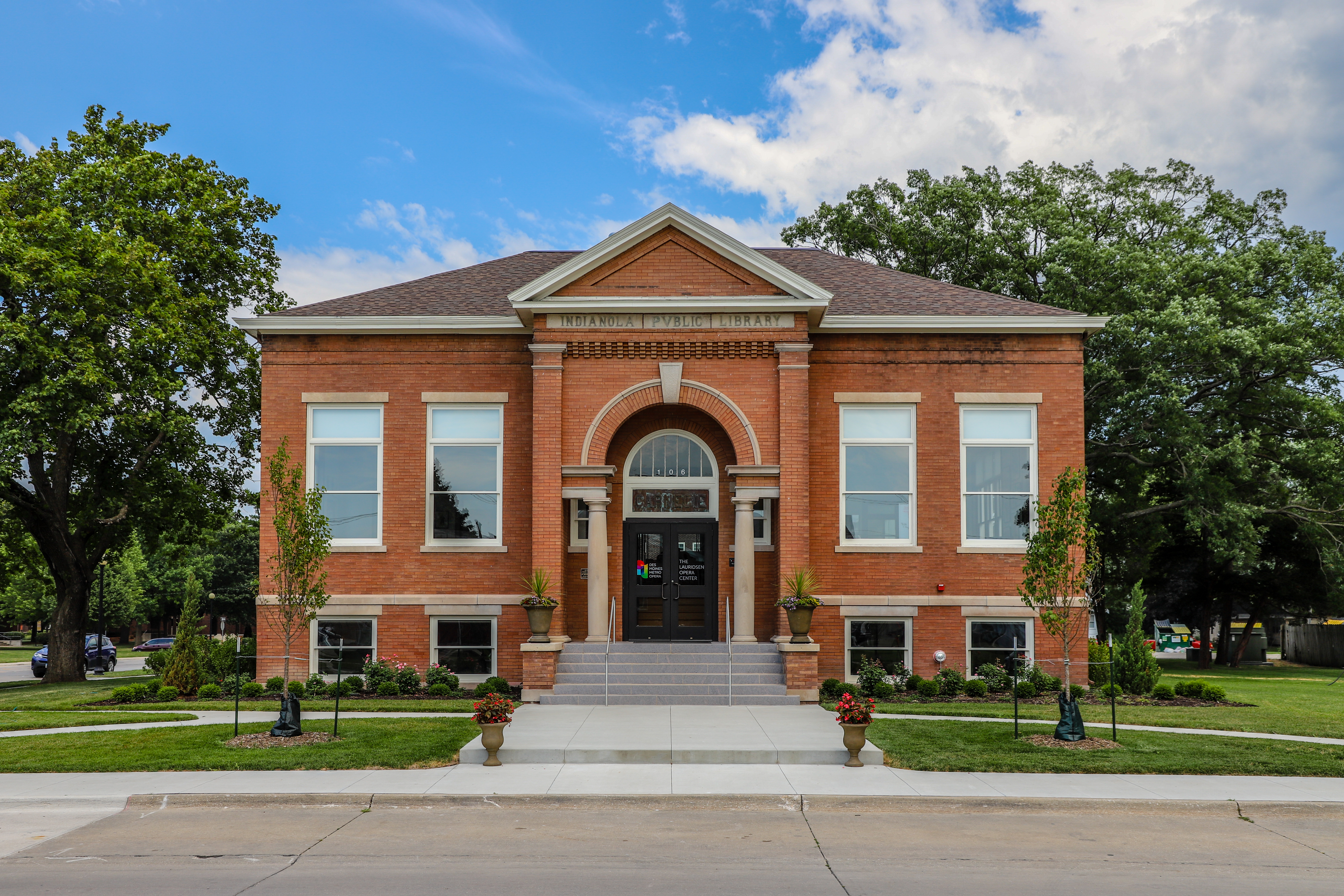

- Location within Iowa Location within the United States
- Location: 106 W. Boston Ave. Indianola, Iowa
- Coordinates: 41°21′45.4″N 93°33′43.1″W
- Area: less than one acre
- Built: 1904
- Built by: G.W. James
- Architect: Beymer & Keith
- Architectural style: Classical Revival
- NRHP reference No.: 100001568
- Added to NRHP: September 5, 2017

The Indianola Carnegie Library is a historic building located in Indianola, Iowa, United States.

== History ==
In November 1902, the local library board submitted a grant application to Andrew Carnegie so they could build a new building. The $10,000 grant was approved on January 13, 1903, and $2,000 was added at a later date. The Indianola City Council agreed to allocate $1,000 a year toward its upkeep. They also bought two lots at the corner of Buxton and Boston. One of the lots was owned by the family of Hannah Babb, the city librarian. Local architect Frederick W. Keith designed the brick Neoclassical structure, and it was built by G.W. James. The library eventually outgrew the building, and it was replaced in 1984. The Des Moines Metro Opera has their offices in the old Carnegie building. It was listed on the National Register of Historic Places in 2017.
