= Stark County Courthouse (North Dakota) =

- U.S. National Register of Historic Places
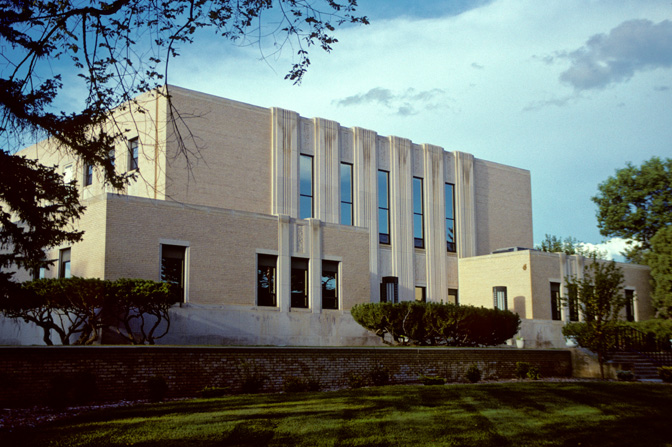

- Location within North Dakota Location within the United States
- Interactive map showing the location of Stark County Courthouse
- Location: 3rd St. N, Dickinson, North Dakota
- Coordinates: 46°52′56″N 102°47′02″W
- Area: 2.1 acres (0.85 ha)
- Built: 1936-1937
- Architect: William F. Kurke
- Architectural style: Art Deco
- MPS: North Dakota County Courthouses TR
- NRHP reference No.: 85002991
- Added to NRHP: November 25, 1985

Stark County Courthouse is a historic courthouse in Dickinson, North Dakota, United States, which was built in 1936–1937. It was added to the National Register of Historic Places on November 25, 1985.

It was built for $213,000, which then represented quite a building boom, giving encouragement "to the local population that the hardest part of the Depression had ended."

It, along with the Hettinger County Courthouse (in Mott) is significant for its Art Deco architecture. The Stark County Courthouse was designed by William F. Kurke, a prolific architect.
