= Beulah, North Dakota =

- City
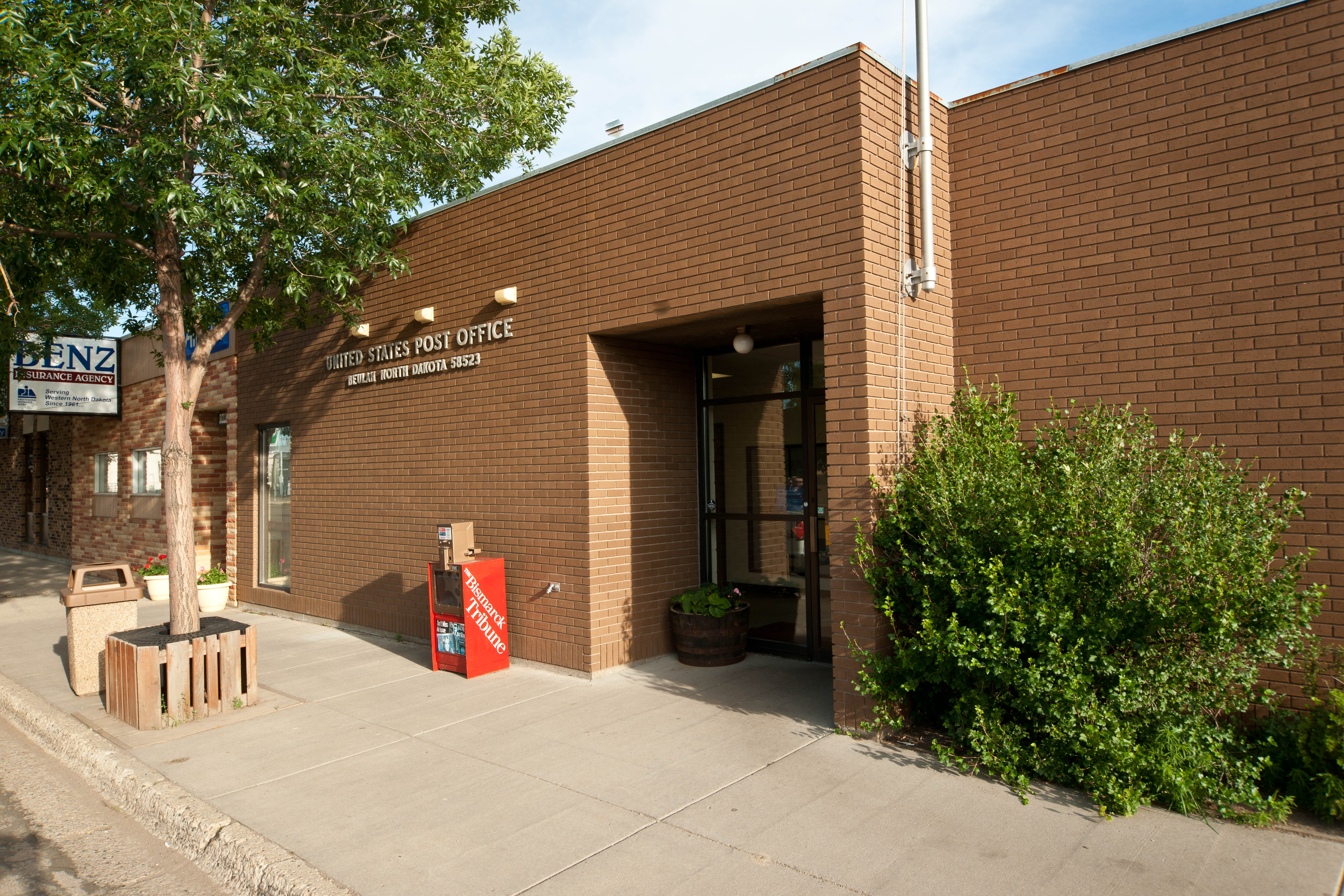
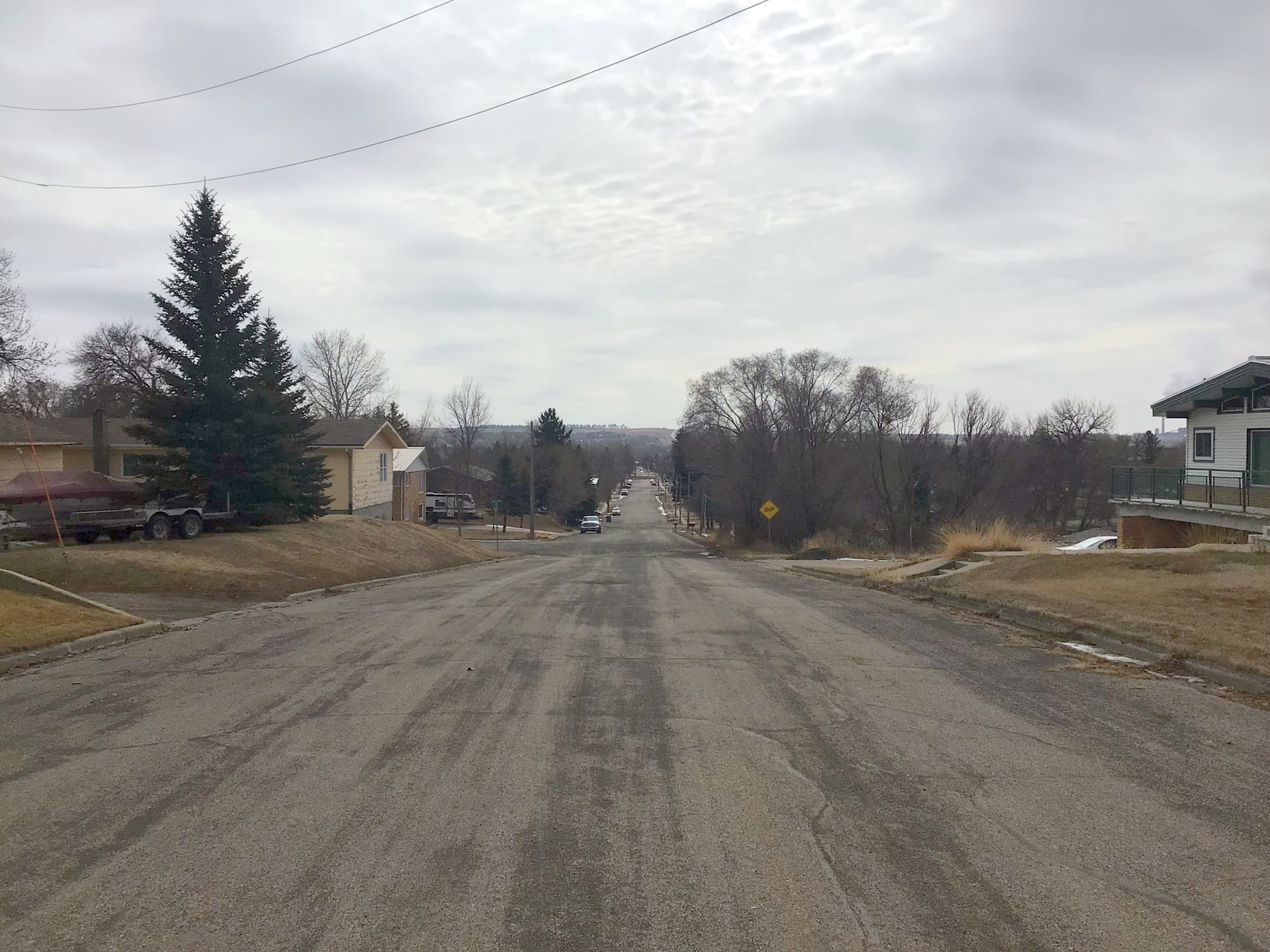
- Post office in Beulah Street in Beulah

- Logo
- Motto: "Small Town Appeal...Big City Looks"
- Location of Beulah, North Dakota

- Location within North Dakota Location within the United States
- Coordinates: 47.266826°N 101.770684°W
- Country: United States
- State: North Dakota
- County: Mercer
- Founded: 1914

Government
  - Mayor: Sean Cheatley
  - Council Member: Tim Aichele; Cameron Brown; Gina Campbell; Kameron Plienis; Bill Keller
  - President: Jason Isaak; Adam Baker

Area
  - Total: 2.468 sq mi (6.392 km^{2})
  - Land: 2.442 sq mi (6.326 km^{2})
  - Water: 0.025 sq mi (0.065 km^{2}) 1.01%
- Elevation: 1,821 ft (555 m)

Population (2020)
  - Total: 3,058
  - Estimate (2024): 3,047
  - Density: 1,247.8/sq mi (481.79/km^{2})
- Time zone: UTC–6 (Central (CST))
  - Summer (DST): UTC–5 (CDT)
- ZIP Code: 58523
- Area code: 701
- FIPS code: 38-06660
- GNIS feature ID: 1035931
- Highways: ND 49
- Website: beulahnd.org

Beulah is a city in Mercer County, North Dakota, United States. The population was 3,058 at the 2020 census, and was estimated at 3,047 in 2024, making it the 17th-most populous city in North Dakota. Beulah is home to the Dakota Gasification Company. It is near the largest lignite mine in the United States, owned by North American Coal Corporation.

== History ==
Beulah was founded in 1914. It was named after Beulah Stinchcombe, the niece of a local land developer.

== Geography ==
According to the United States Census Bureau, the city has a total area of 2.468 square miles (6.39 km^{2}), of which 2.443 square miles (6.33 km^{2}) is land and 0.025 square miles (0.06 km^{2}) (1.01%) is water.

=== Climate ===
Climate data for Beulah, North Dakota (1981–2010)
Month	Jan	Feb	Mar	Apr	May	Jun	Jul	Aug	Sep	Oct	Nov	Dec	Year
Mean daily maximum °F (°C)	19.1 (−7.2)	21.6 (−5.8)	36.9 (2.7)	55.5 (13.1)	65.6 (18.7)	74.0 (23.3)	84.0 (28.9)	82.7 (28.2)	72.9 (22.7)	56.0 (13.3)	42.0 (5.6)	18.2 (−7.7)	52.4 (11.3)
Mean daily minimum °F (°C)	0.3 (−17.6)	2.7 (−16.3)	17.8 (−7.9)	30.5 (−0.8)	41.4 (5.2)	50.2 (10.1)	56.4 (13.6)	54.4 (12.4)	45.9 (7.7)	33.1 (0.6)	20.3 (−6.5)	1.1 (−17.2)	29.5 (−1.4)
Average precipitation inches (mm)	0.66 (17)	0.65 (17)	0.89 (23)	0.88 (22)	2.75 (70)	3.36 (85)	1.93 (49)	1.12 (28)	2.18 (55)	1.25 (32)	0.51 (13)	0.55 (14)	16.73 (425)
Average snowfall inches (cm)	12.6 (32)	9.2 (23)	14.5 (37)	4.8 (12)	3.4 (8.6)	0.3 (0.76)	0.0 (0.0)	0.0 (0.0)	0.3 (0.76)	2.8 (7.1)	4.3 (11)	19.3 (49)	71.3 (181)
Source: NOAA

== Demographics ==
Historical population
Census	Pop.	Note	%±
1920	552		—
1930	913		65.4%
1940	942		3.2%
1950	1,501		59.3%
1960	1,318		−12.2%
1970	1,344		2.0%
1980	2,908		116.4%
1990	3,363		15.6%
2000	3,152		−6.3%
2010	3,121		−1.0%
2020	3,058		−2.0%
2024 (est.)	3,047		−0.4%
U.S. Decennial Census; 2020 Census

According to realtor website Zillow, the average price of a home as of August 31, 2025, in Beulah is $240,416.

As of the 2023 American Community Survey, there are 1,231 estimated households in Beulah with an average of 2.39 persons per household. The city has a median household income of $84,417. Approximately 8.3% of the city's population lives at or below the poverty line. Beulah has an estimated 57.1% employment rate, with 19.8% of the population holding a bachelor's degree or higher and 89.3% holding a high school diploma. There were 1,636 housing units at an average density of 669.67 per square mile (258.6/km^{2}).

The top five reported languages (people were allowed to report up to two languages, thus the figures will generally add to more than 100%) were English (94.2%), Spanish (0.8%), Indo-European (4.0%), Asian and Pacific Islander (0.5%), and Other (2.3%).

=== Racial and ethnic composition ===
Beulah, North Dakota – racial and ethnic composition Note: the US Census treats Hispanic/Latino as an ethnic category. This table excludes Latinos from the racial categories and assigns them to a separate category. Hispanics/Latinos may be of any race.
Race / ethnicity (NH = non-Hispanic)	Pop. 1980	Pop. 1990	Pop. 2000	Pop. 2010	Pop. 2020
White alone (NH)	2,838 (97.59%)	3,234 (96.16%)	3,007 (95.4%)	2,934 (94.01%)	2,726 (89.14%)
Black or African American alone (NH)	6 (0.21%)	7 (0.21%)	1 (0.03%)	7 (0.22%)	29 (0.95%)
Native American or Alaska Native alone (NH)	51 (1.75%)	91 (2.71%)	53 (1.68%)	58 (1.86%)	44 (1.44%)
Asian alone (NH)	2 (0.07%)	8 (0.24%)	9 (0.29%)	8 (0.26%)	20 (0.65%)
Pacific Islander alone (NH)	—	—	20 (0.63%)	8 (0.26%)	0 (0.00%)
Other race alone (NH)	0 (0.00%)	1 (0.03%)	3 (0.10%)	0 (0.00%)	5 (0.16%)
Mixed race or multiracial (NH)	—	—	44 (1.40%)	35 (1.12%)	119 (3.89%)
Hispanic or Latino (any race)	14 (0.48%)	22 (0.65%)	15 (0.48%)	71 (2.27%)	115 (3.76%)
Total	2,908 (100.00%)	3,363 (100.00%)	3,152 (100.00%)	3,121 (100.00%)	3,058 (100.00%)

=== 2020 census ===
As of the 2020 census, there were 3,058 people, 1,232 households, and 805 families residing in the city. The median age was 39.8 years. 27.0% of residents were under the age of 18 and 18.1% of residents were 65 years of age or older. For every 100 females there were 101.6 males, and for every 100 females age 18 and over there were 99.2 males age 18 and over.

0.0% of residents lived in urban areas, while 100.0% lived in rural areas.

Of the city's households, 31.3% had children under the age of 18 living in them. Of all households, 54.9% were married-couple households, 18.9% were households with a male householder and no spouse or partner present, and 20.2% were households with a female householder and no spouse or partner present. About 30.4% of all households were made up of individuals and 12.2% had someone living alone who was 65 years of age or older.

There were 1,560 housing units, of which 21.0% were vacant. The homeowner vacancy rate was 2.6% and the rental vacancy rate was 41.1%. The population density was 1,251.74 inhabitants per square mile (483.3/km^{2}). Housing density was 638.56 per square mile (246.5/km^{2}).

=== 2010 census ===
As of the 2010 census, there were 3,121 people, 1,353 households, and 862 families residing in the city. The population density was 1,252.41 inhabitants per square mile (483.6/km^{2}). There were 1,508 housing units at an average density of 605.14 per square mile (233.6/km^{2}). The racial makeup of the city was 94.78% White, 0.22% African American, 2.31% Native American, 0.26% Asian, 0.26% Pacific Islander, 0.74% from some other races and 1.44% from two or more races. Hispanic or Latino people of any race were 2.27% of the population.

There were 1,353 households, of which 26.8% had children under the age of 18 living with them, 55.1% were married couples living together, 4.7% had a female householder with no husband present, 3.9% had a male householder with no wife present, and 36.3% were non-families. 31.9% of all households were made up of individuals, and 12.1% had someone living alone who was 65 years of age or older. The average household size was 2.24 and the average family size was 2.81.

The median age in the city was 44.2 years. 22.3% of residents were under the age of 18; 6.4% were between the ages of 18 and 24; 22.1% were from 25 to 44; 34.3% were from 45 to 64; and 14.9% were 65 years of age or older. The gender makeup of the city was 51.3% male and 48.7% female.

=== 2000 census ===
As of the 2000 census, there were 3,152 people, 1,213 households, and 851 families residing in the city. The population density was 1,307.88 inhabitants per square mile (505.0/km^{2}). There were 1,475 housing units at an average density of 612.03 per square mile (236.3/km^{2}). The racial makeup of the city was 95.78% White, 0.03% African American, 1.68% Native American, 0.29% Asian, 0.63% Pacific Islander, 0.16% from some other races and 1.43% from two or more races. Hispanic or Latino people of any race were 0.48% of the population.

The top six ancestry groups in the city are German (74.3%), Norwegian (12.3%), Irish (9.3%), Russian (7.7%), English (3.4%), Czech (2.3%).

There were 1,213 households, of which 39.9% had children under the age of 18 living with them, 61.0% were married couples living together, 6.8% had a female householder with no husband present, and 29.8% were non-families. 27.8% of all households were made up of individuals, and 12.9% had someone living alone who was 65 years of age or older. The average household size was 2.53 and the average family size was 3.09.

The median household income was $45,256 and the median family income was $54,700. Males had a median income of $50,870 versus $20,792 for females. The per capita income for the city was $18,614. About 5.3% of families and 7.8% of the population were below the poverty line, including 4.6% of those under age 18 and 30.0% of those age 65 or over.

== Education ==
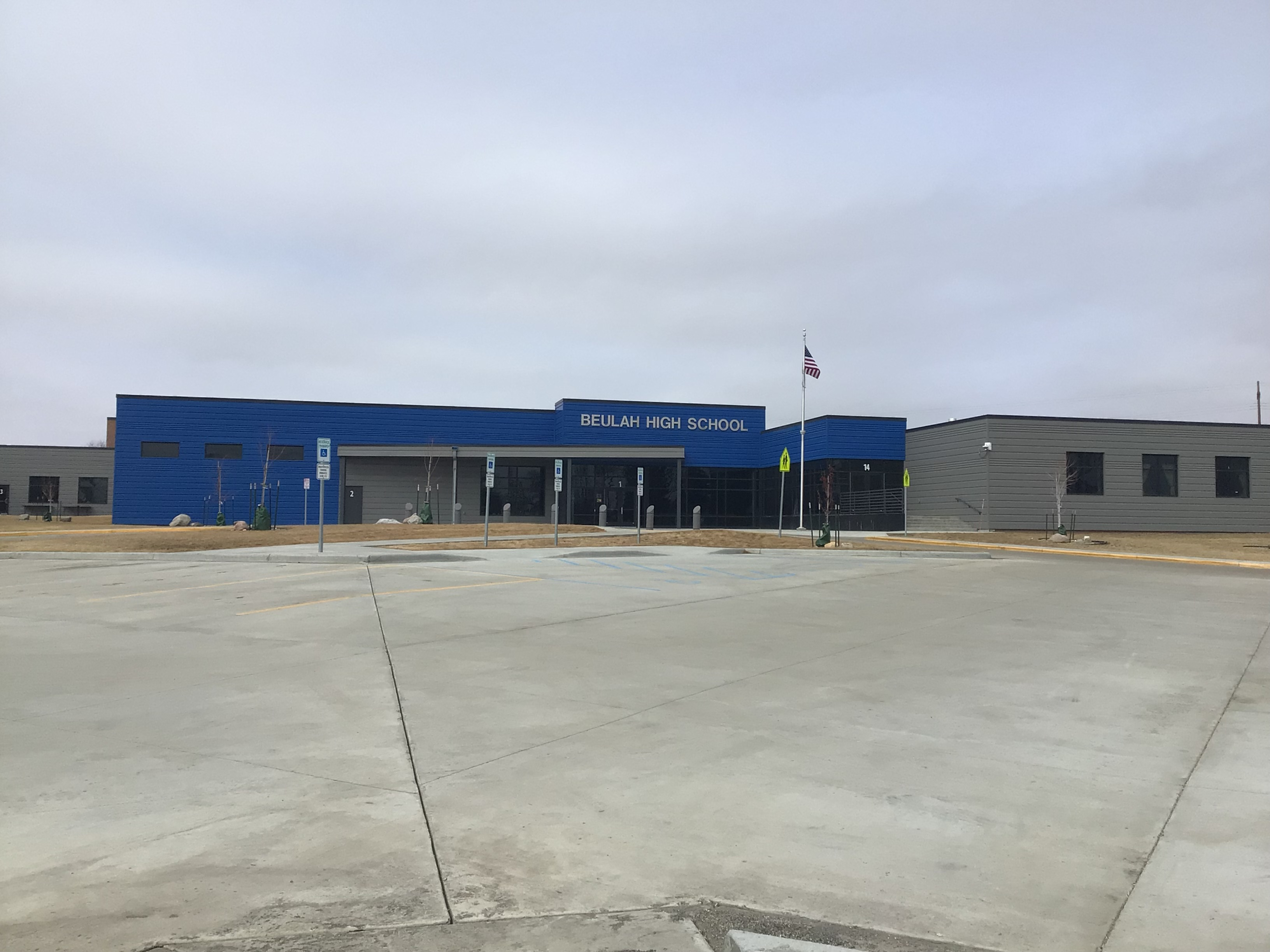
Beulah High School

Beulah's educational system started with a one-room school house, located in an unused barn south of city. At its advent, only five local children attended the school. As its reputation grew, children from surrounding communities increased the school's attendance to over one hundred students. The school went on to receive several awards for educational excellence and was considered the pride of the city until a fire in 1934 destroyed the building. Previously, an additional Beulah School was built in 1920.

Beulah has an elementary, middle, and high school. The sports teams are called the Miners. The American Legion baseball team is called the Cyclones.

== Transportation ==
North Dakota State Highway 49 is the main route in the city.
