= Wishek, North Dakota =

City in North Dakota, United States

- City
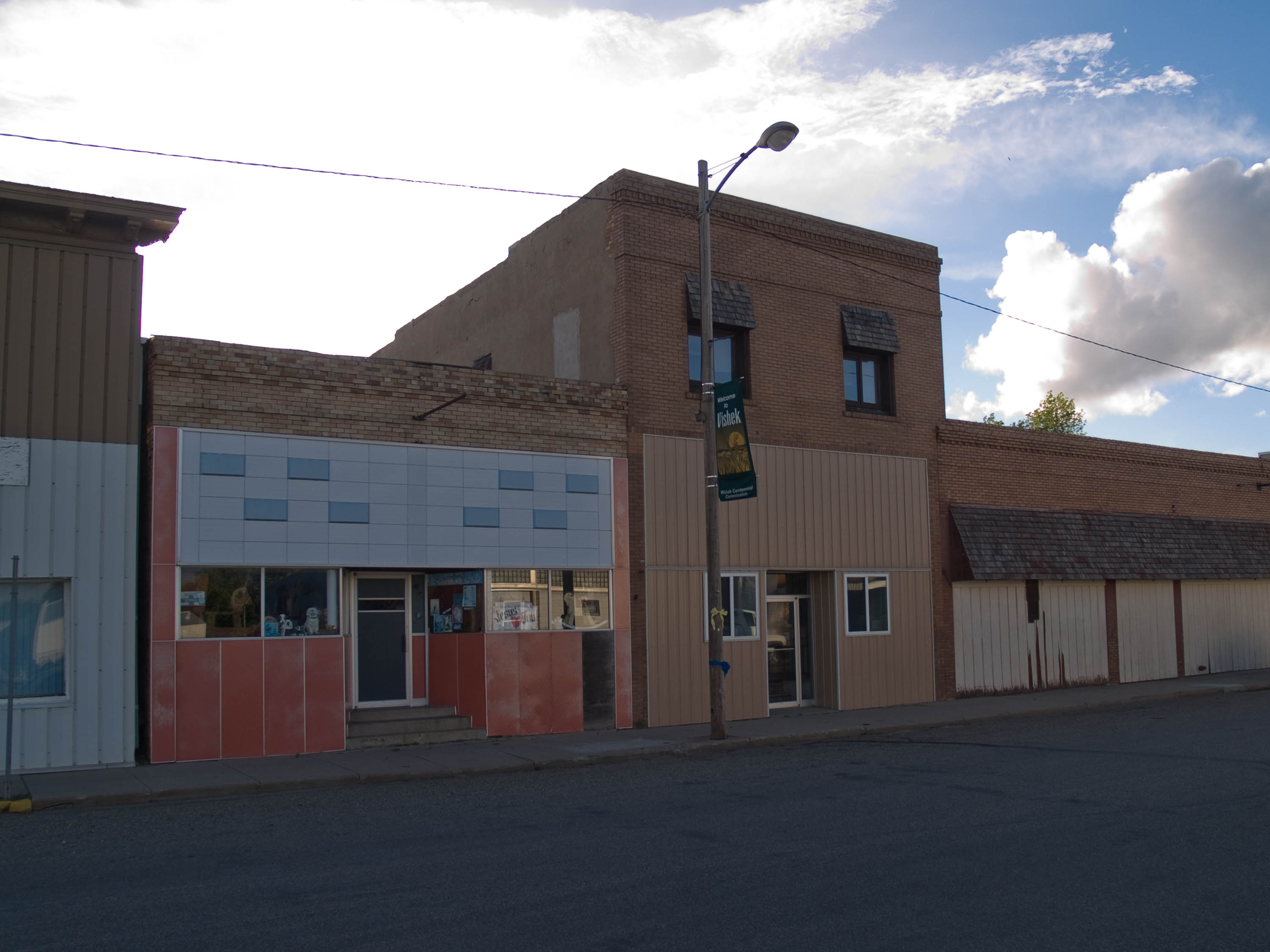
- D&B Engraving and Tees, Wishek (June 2008)

- Logo
- Motto: "Explore the Outdoors"
- Interactive map of Wishek, North Dakota
- Location within North Dakota
- Coordinates: 46.2556°N 99.5545°W
- Country: United States
- State: North Dakota
- County: McIntosh
- Founded: 1898
- Incorporated (village): 1907
- Incorporated (city): 1930
- Named for: John H. Wishek Sr.

Government
  - Type: Mayor–council
  - Mayor: Whittney Lipp
  - President: Chris Opsahl
  - Vice president: Jason Becker
  - Councilmembers: Jessica Welder; Jim Eiseman; Robert Roth; Greg Salwei

Area
  - Total: 1.444 sq mi (3.740 km^{2})
  - Land: 1.436 sq mi (3.718 km^{2})
  - Water: 0.0093 sq mi (0.024 km^{2}) 0.62%
- Elevation: 2,030 ft (620 m)

Population (2020)
  - Total: 864
  - Estimate (2025): 827
  - Density: 602/sq mi (232/km^{2})
- Time zone: UTC–6 (Central (CST))
  - Summer (DST): UTC–5 (CDT)
- ZIP Code: 58495
- Area code: 701
- FIPS code: 38-87020
- GNIS feature ID: 1036340
- Highways: ND 3, ND 13
- Website: wishek-nd.com

Wishek (/ˈwɪʃɪk/ WISH-ik) is a city in McIntosh County, North Dakota, United States. The population was 864 as of the 2020 census, and was estimated at 827 in 2025.

== History ==
Wishek was platted in 1898 when the railroad was extended to that point. A post office has been in operation at Wishek since 1898. The city was named in honor of John H. Wishek Sr., a local cattleman. Wishek was originally built up chiefly by Germans from Russia. The Old Wishek City Hall was built in 1916.

== Geography ==
According to the United States Census Bureau, the city has an area of 1.444 square miles (3.74 km^{2}), of which 1.435 square miles (3.72 km^{2}) is land and 0.009 square miles (0.02 km^{2}) (0.62%) is water.

== Climate ==
This climatic region is typified by large seasonal temperature differences, with warm to hot (and often humid) summers and cold (sometimes severely cold) winters. According to the Köppen Climate Classification system, Wishek has a humid continental climate, abbreviated "Dfb" on climate maps.

== Demographics ==
Historical population
Census	Pop.	Note	%±
1910	432		—
1920	1,003		132.2%
1930	1,146		14.3%
1940	1,112		−3.0%
1950	1,241		11.6%
1960	1,290		3.9%
1970	1,275		−1.2%
1980	1,345		5.5%
1990	1,171		−12.9%
2000	1,122		−4.2%
2010	1,002		−10.7%
2020	864		−13.8%
2025 (est.)	827		−4.3%
U.S. Decennial Census; 2020 Census

As of the 2024 American Community Survey, there were 371 estimated households in Wishek with an average of 2.07 persons per household. The city has a median household income of $69,904. Approximately 12.9% of the city's population lives at or below the poverty line. Wishek has an estimated 59.8% employment rate, with 23.2% of the population holding a bachelor's degree or higher and 86.3% holding a high school diploma. There were 434 housing units at an average density of 302.44 per square mile (116.8/km^{2}).

The top five reported languages (people were allowed to report up to two languages, thus the figures will generally add to more than 100%) were English (82.2%), Spanish (6.0%), Indo-European (11.1%), Asian and Pacific Islander (0.1%), and Other (0.5%).

The median age in the city was 48.6 years.

Wishek, North Dakota – racial and ethnic composition Note: the US Census treats Hispanic/Latino as an ethnic category. This table excludes Latinos from the racial categories and assigns them to a separate category. Hispanics/Latinos may be of any race.
Race / ethnicity (NH = non-Hispanic)	Pop. 1990	Pop. 2000	Pop. 2010	Pop. 2020	% 1990	% 2000	% 2010	% 2020
White alone (NH)	1,165	1,093	958	773	99.49%	97.42%	95.61%	89.47%
Black or African American alone (NH)	0	0	0	3	0.00%	0.00%	0.00%	0.35%
Native American or Alaska Native alone (NH)	2	2	9	5	0.17%	0.18%	0.90%	0.58%
Asian alone (NH)	1	0	1	13	0.09%	0.00%	0.10%	1.50%
Pacific Islander alone (NH)	—	1	0	0	—	0.09%	0.00%	0.00%
Other race alone (NH)	0	0	0	6	0.00%	0.00%	0.00%	0.69%
Mixed race or multiracial (NH)	—	9	3	25	—	0.80%	0.30%	2.89%
Hispanic or Latino (any race)	3	17	31	39	0.26%	1.52%	3.09%	4.51%
Total	1,171	1,122	1,002	864	100.00%	100.00%	100.00%	100.00%

=== 2020 census ===
As of the 2020 census, there were 864 people, 396 households, and 216 families residing in the city. The population density was 602.09 inhabitants per square mile (232.5/km^{2}). There were 500 housing units at an average density of 348.43 per square mile (134.5/km^{2}). The racial makeup of the city was 90.86% White, 0.35% African American, 0.81% Native American, 1.50% Asian, 0.00% Pacific Islander, 3.01% from some other races, and 3.47% from two or more races. Hispanic or Latino people of any race were 4.51% of the population.

There were 396 households, 19.7% had children under the age of 18 living with them, 47.7% were married couples living together, 2.8% had a male householder with no spouse present, 4.0% had a female householder with no spouse present, and 45.5% were non-families. 42.4% of households were one person and 23.0% were one person aged 65 or older. The average household size was 2.05 and the average family size was 2.87.

The median age was 55.0 years. 19.4% of residents were under the age of 18; 5.1% were between the ages of 18 and 24; 18.2% were from 25 to 44; 20.7% were from 45 to 64; and 36.9% were 65 or older. The gender makeup of the city was 48.5% male and 51.5% female.

=== 2010 census ===
As of the 2010 census, there were 1,002 people, 454 households, and 263 families residing in the city. The population density was 693.91 inhabitants per square mile (267.9/km^{2}). There were 516 housing units at an average density of 357.34 per square mile (138.0/km^{2}). The racial makeup of the city was 98.30% White, 0.00% African American, 0.90% Native American, 0.10% Asian, 0.00% Pacific Islander, 0.40% from some other races, and 0.30% from two or more races. Hispanic or Latino people of any race were 3.09% of the population.

There were 454 households, 20.0% had children under the age of 18 living with them, 52.4% were married couples living together, 3.7% had a female householder with no husband present, 1.8% had a male householder with no wife present, and 42.1% were non-families. 39.0% of households were one person and 23.8% were one person aged 65 or older. The average household size was 2.08 and the average family size was 2.75.

The median age was 51.5 years. 19.9% of residents were under the age of 18; 4.1% were between the ages of 18 and 24; 19.1% were from 25 to 44; 22.1% were from 45 to 64; and 34.9% were 65 or older. The gender makeup of the city was 47.0% male and 53.0% female.

=== 2000 census ===
Languages (2000)	Percent
Spoke English at home	66.95%
Spoke German at home	33.05%

As of the 2000 census, there were 1,122 people, 466 households, and 290 families residing in the city. The population density was 772.15 inhabitants per square mile (298.1/km^{2}). There were 532 housing units at an average density of 366.12 per square mile (141.4/km^{2}). The racial makeup of the city was 98.84% White, 0.00% African American, 0.18% Native American, 0.00% Asian, 0.09% Pacific Islander, 0.09% from some other races, and 0.80% from two or more races. Hispanic or Latino people of any race were 1.52% of the population.

There were 466 households, 24.2% had children under the age of 18 living with them, 57.5% were married couples living together, 3.2% had a female householder with no husband present, and 37.6% were non-families. 35.0% of households were one person and 23.0% were one person aged 65 or older. The average household size was 2.15 and the average family size was 2.77.

The age distribution was 18.2% under the age of 18, 5.0% from 18 to 24, 18.4% from 25 to 44, 19.8% from 45 to 64, and 38.6% 65 or older. The median age was 54 years. For every 100 females, there were 82.4 males. For every 100 females age 18 and over, there were 81.1 males.

The median household income was $30,208 and the median family income was $36,696. Males had a median income of $25,441 versus $17,875 for females. The per capita income for the city was $17,111. About 4.4% of families and 6.4% of the population were below the poverty line, including 3.2% of those under age 18 and 10.9% of those age 65 or over.

== Education ==
Wishek is served by the Wishek Public School District 19. It operates the Wishek School. In the 2025-26 academic year, the district reported a total of 250 students.

== Notable people ==
- Ted Mann, owner of the Mann Theatres
- Mark Pfeifle, top national security adviser and communicator for President George W. Bush
