= Bismarck Cathedral Area Historic District =

Historic district in North Dakota, United States

Coordinates: 46°48′37.9″N 100°47′46.56″W

- U.S. National Register of Historic Places
- U.S. Historic district
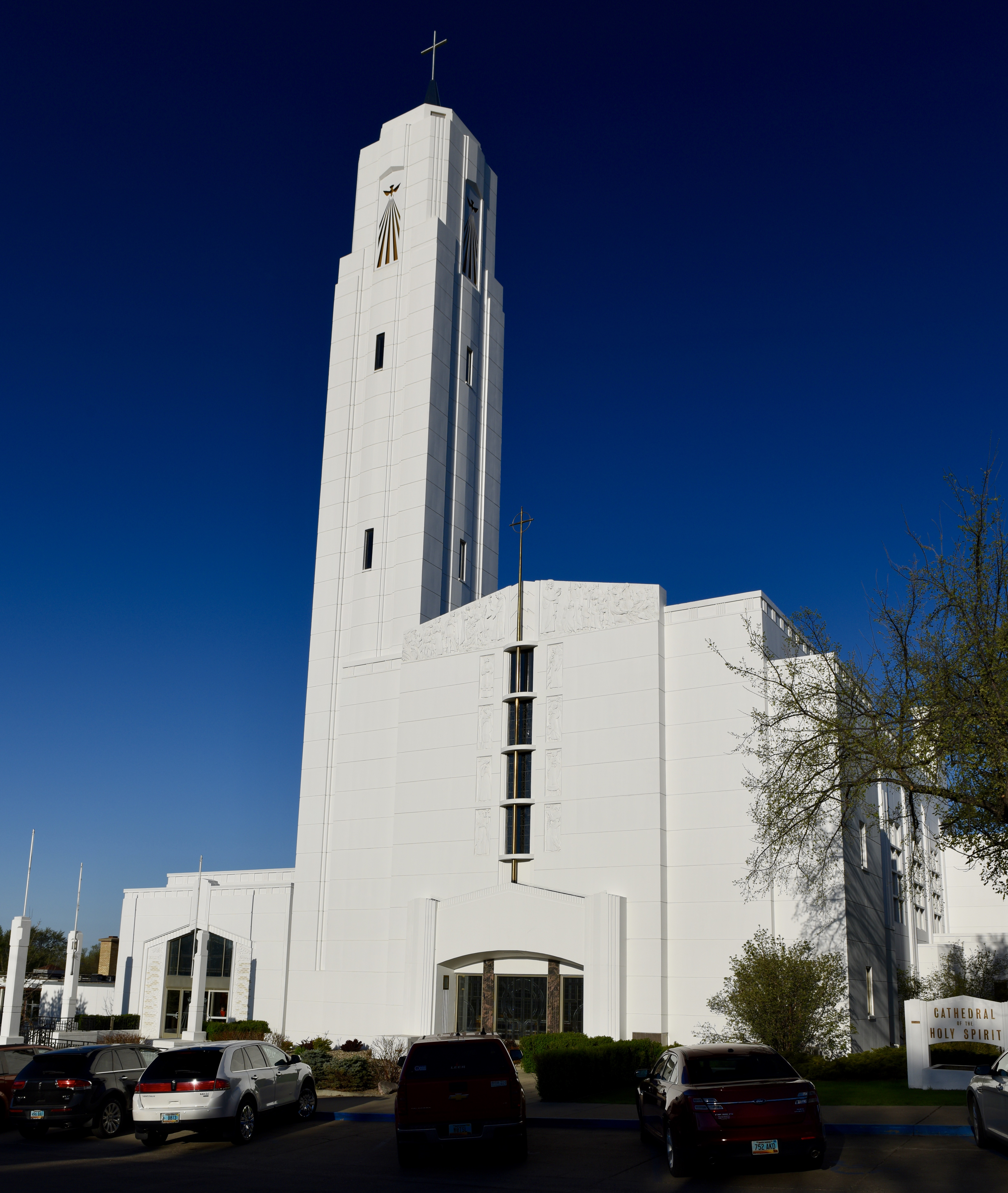
- Cathedral of the Holy Spirit (1945)

- Location within North Dakota Location within the United States
- Location: Roughly bounded by Hannifan and N 1st Sts., Aves. C and A West, (1980); Roughly along N. First, N. Mandan, N. Washington, and N. Raymond Sts., and Aves. C, D, and E West (1997), 104,106,112,115,116,120 E Ave B & 523 N 1st St (Remove 316,320 W Ave A & 510 N Washington St), (2010); Bismarck, North Dakota
- Area: 27.3 acres (11.0 ha) (1980); 15 acres (6.1 ha) (1997); 1.3 acres (0.53 ha) (2010)
- Architect: Purcell, Feick & Elmslie; et al. (1980); Leonhard, Herman M. (1997)
- Architectural style: Bungalow/Craftsman, Colonial Revival, Tudor Revival, (1980); Late 19th and 20th Century Revivals, Modern Movement, Gable Front; Foursquare (2010)
- NRHP reference No.: 80002908, 97001142, 10000138
- Added to NRHP: May 8, 1980 (original); October 24, 1997 (increase I); March 31, 2010 (increase II)

The Bismarck Cathedral Area Historic District, also known as The Hill, is a historic district in Bismarck, North Dakota, United States, that is listed on the National Register of Historic Places (NRHP). A first 27.3-acre (11.0 ha) area was NRHP-listed in 1980. The original listing included 47 contributing buildings, including the Cathedral of the Holy Spirit. The district was increased by 15 acres (6.1 ha) with 40 contributing buildings and one contributing site in 1997. The district was further changed in 2010 by subtraction of some buildings and properties, and by the addition of others.
