= Dickinson State Normal School Campus District =

Historic district in North Dakota, United States

- U.S. National Register of Historic Places
- U.S. Historic district
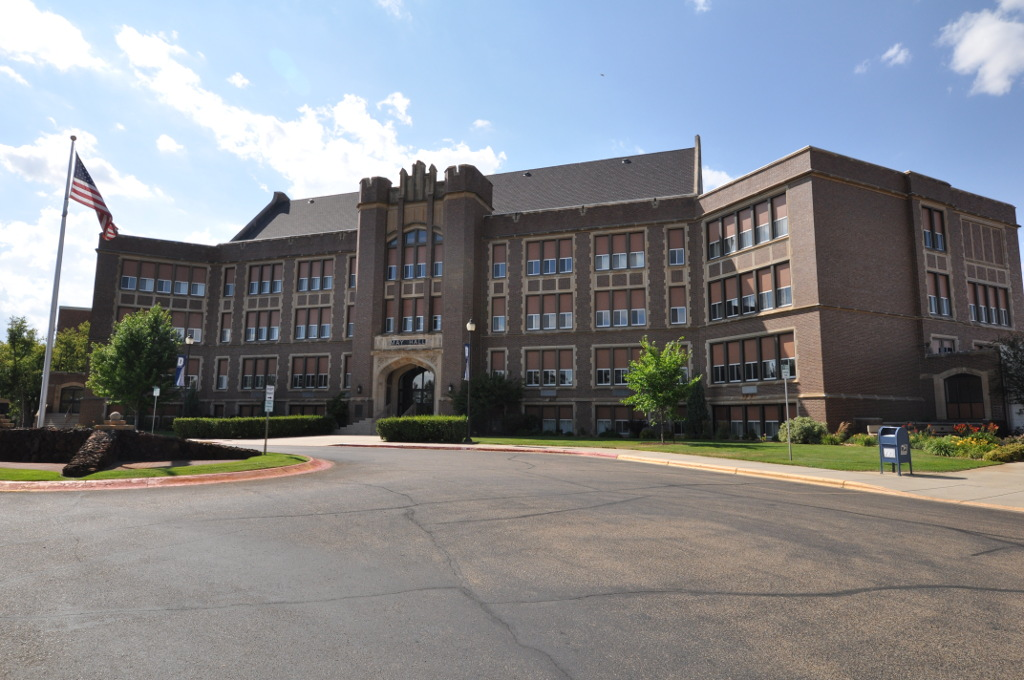

- Location within North Dakota Location within the United States
- Location: Roughly bounded by State Ave., Fairway St., 8th Ave., W., and 2nd St., W., Dickinson, North Dakota
- Coordinates: 46.88262°N 102.80056°W
- Area: 16 acres (6.5 ha)
- Built: 1922
- Architect: Keith & Kurke; Morell & Arthur R. Nichols (landscape architects); Ira L. Rush
- Architectural style: Tudor Revival
- NRHP reference No.: 97000285
- Added to NRHP: March 28, 1997

The Dickinson State Normal School Campus District in Dickinson, North Dakota is a 16-acre (6.5 ha) historic district that has work dating to 1922. It includes Tudor Revival architecture. It has also been known as Dickinson State Teachers College, Dickinson State College, and Dickinson State University.

It was listed on the National Register of Historic Places in 1997. The listing included three contributing buildings and one other contributing site.

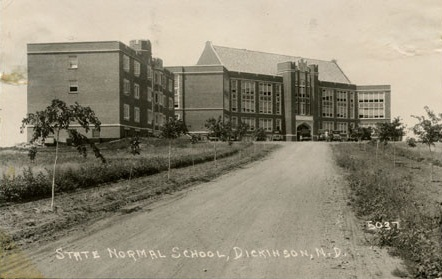
May and Stickney Halls at State Normal School, c. 1924

Among its many features is "a stone fence with gate posts".
