= Leach Public Library =

- U.S. National Register of Historic Places
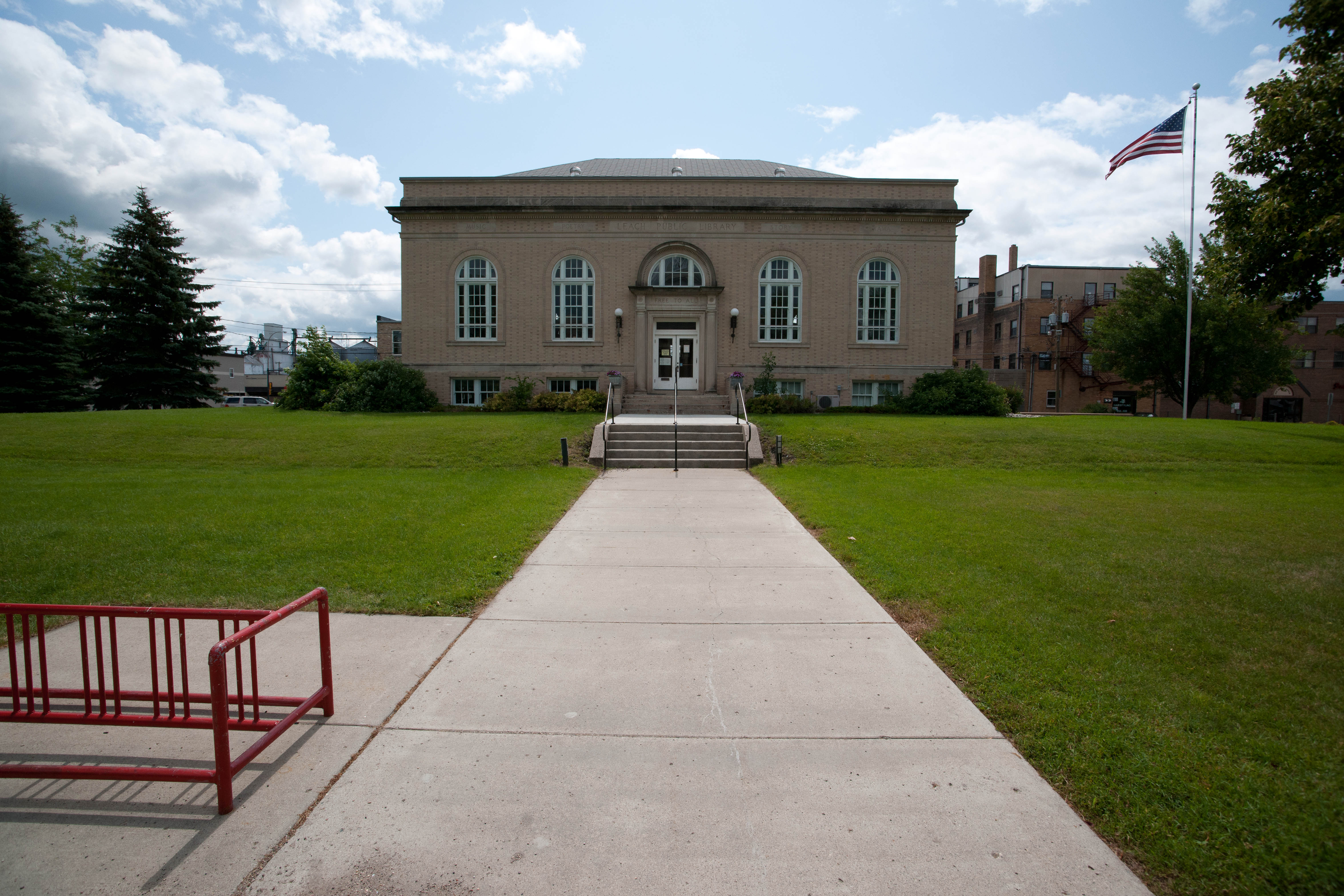

- Location within North Dakota Location within the United States
- Location: 417 Second Ave. N., Wahpeton, North Dakota
- Coordinates: 46°15′53″N 96°36′22″W
- Area: 1 acre (0.40 ha)
- Built: 1923
- Architect: Keith & Kurke
- Architectural style: Classical Revival
- MPS: Philanthropically Established Libraries in North Dakota MPS
- NRHP reference No.: 89002303
- Added to NRHP: January 26, 1990

The Leach Public Library in Wahpeton, North Dakota was built in 1923. It was listed on the National Register of Historic Places in 1990.

It was funded by Orrin Leach, who also served as Wahpeton's mayor. When his initial $25,000 contribution proved inadequate, he gave more funds.

Fargo architects Keith & Kurke provided the design.
