= Liberty Memorial Building =

Coordinates: 46°49′09″N 100°46′53″W

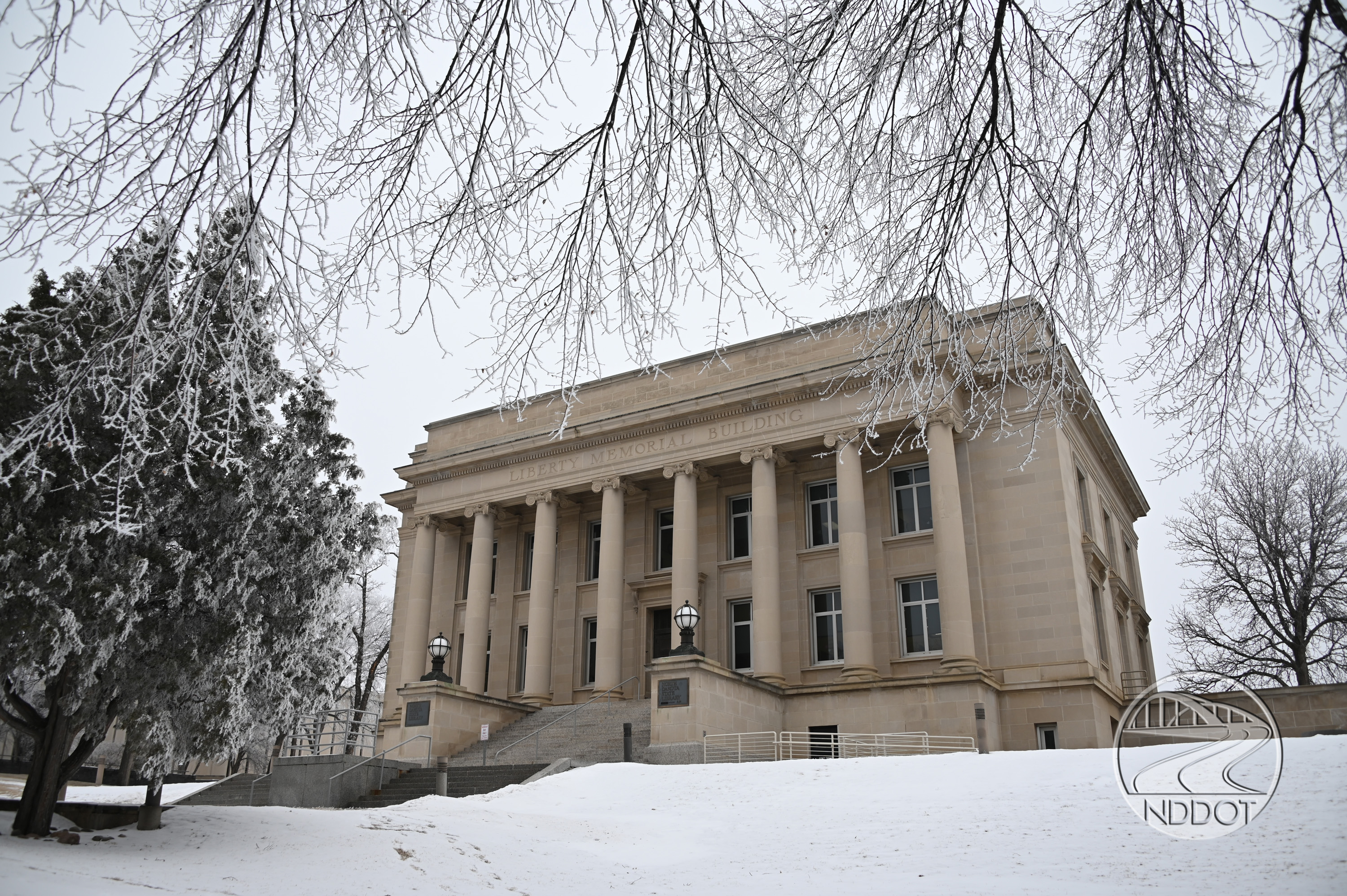
Liberty Memorial Building, February 2021

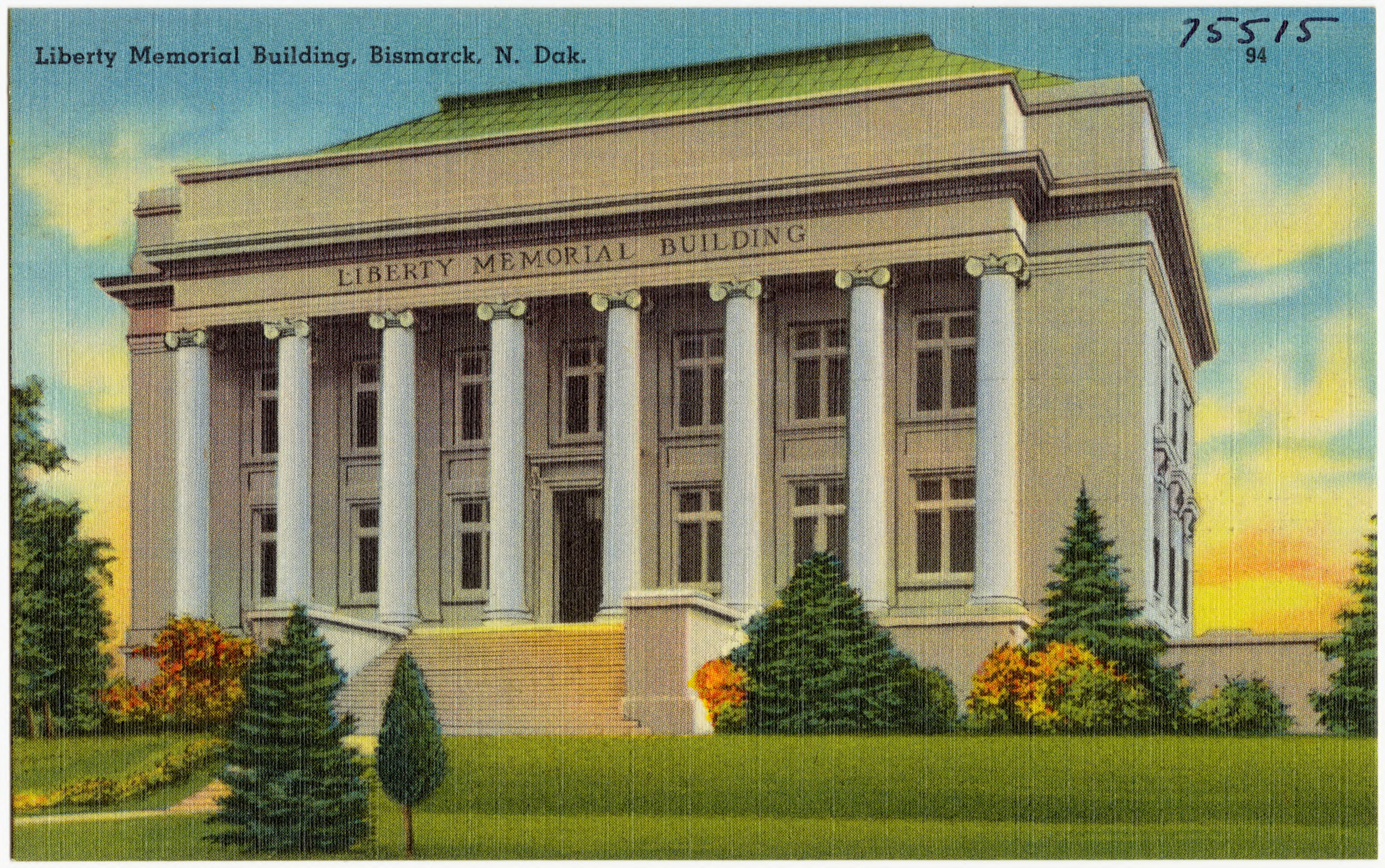
Liberty Memorial Building postcard, circa 1930–1945

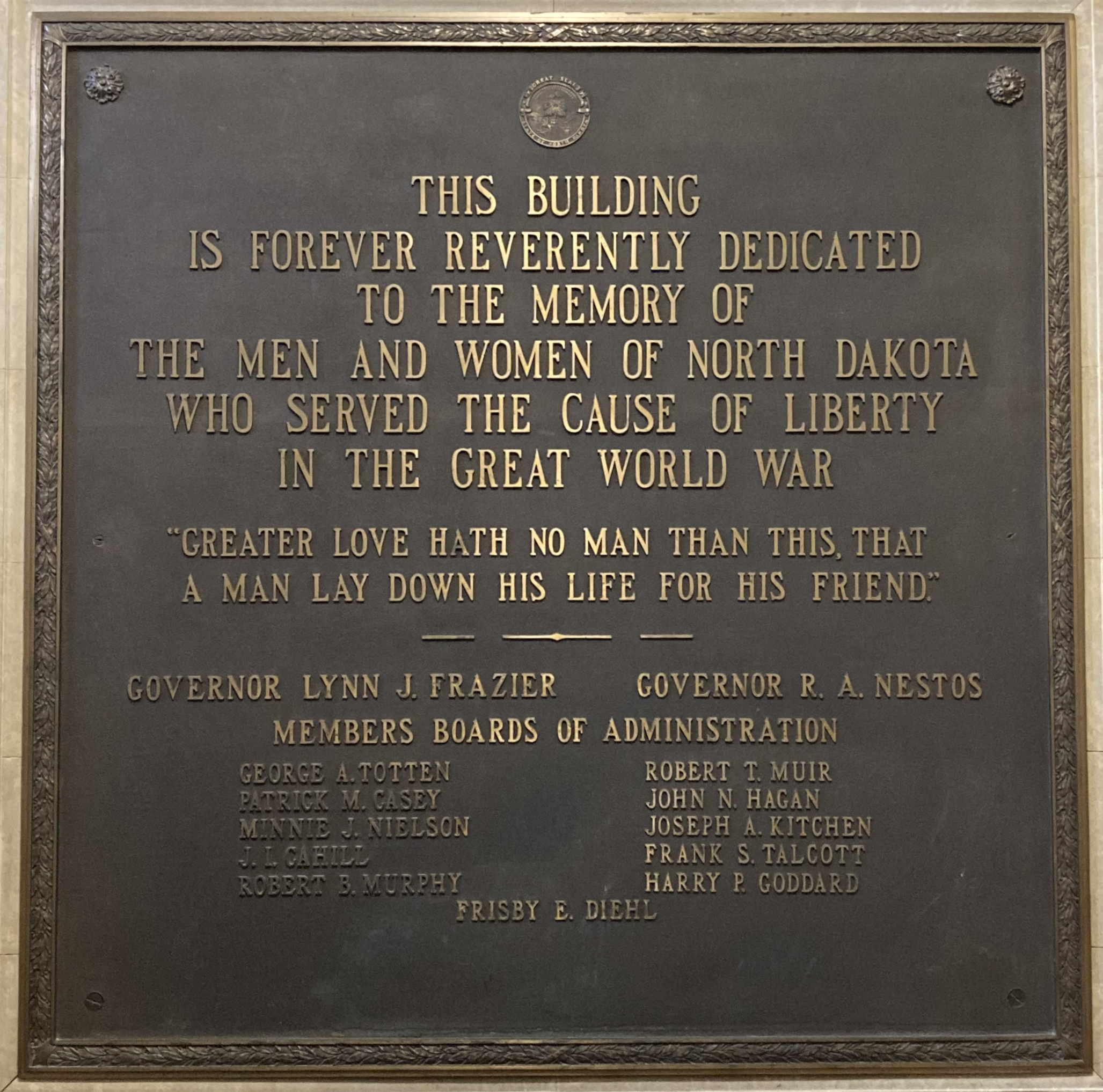
Dedication plaque for the Liberty Memorial Building in Bismarck, North Dakota.

The Liberty Memorial Building is a building located on the North Dakota State Capitol grounds in Bismarck, North Dakota. The Liberty Memorial Building was completed in 1924, and is the oldest building still standing on the capitol grounds. The Liberty Memorial Building is the home of the North Dakota State Library.

== History ==
The Liberty Memorial Building is located at 604 East Boulevard Avenue on the capitol grounds in Bismarck. It was originally built to provide additional office space for state agencies and to mark the end of World War I. The building is dedicated to the memory of the men and women of North Dakota who served in that war. It was designed in 1920 by Keith & Kurke, of Fargo and Bismarck, and it was finished in 1924 with a cost of $450,000.

== Design ==
The design of the building is typical of the federal-type buildings of the era and is designed in the classical style of architecture with a limestone exterior. The foundation was constructed using sawed granite, and the exterior ground level walls are made of Bedford stone. The main doors at the top of a large set of stairs are made from ornamental bronze, and the walls of the first floor lobby are finished in Kasota Stone, which was quarried in Kasota, Minnesota. The first floor corridor and the grand stairway are finished in travertine that was imported from Italy. The floors of the corridors and tread of stairway are made from Terrazzo and Kasota Marble, and the balusters and railing are made from Italian Travertine and Italian Tavernelle Clairemarble.

In 1981, the building underwent a major renovation which updated existing systems to modern code specifications.
