= Columbia Central Fire Station =

- U.S. National Register of Historic Places
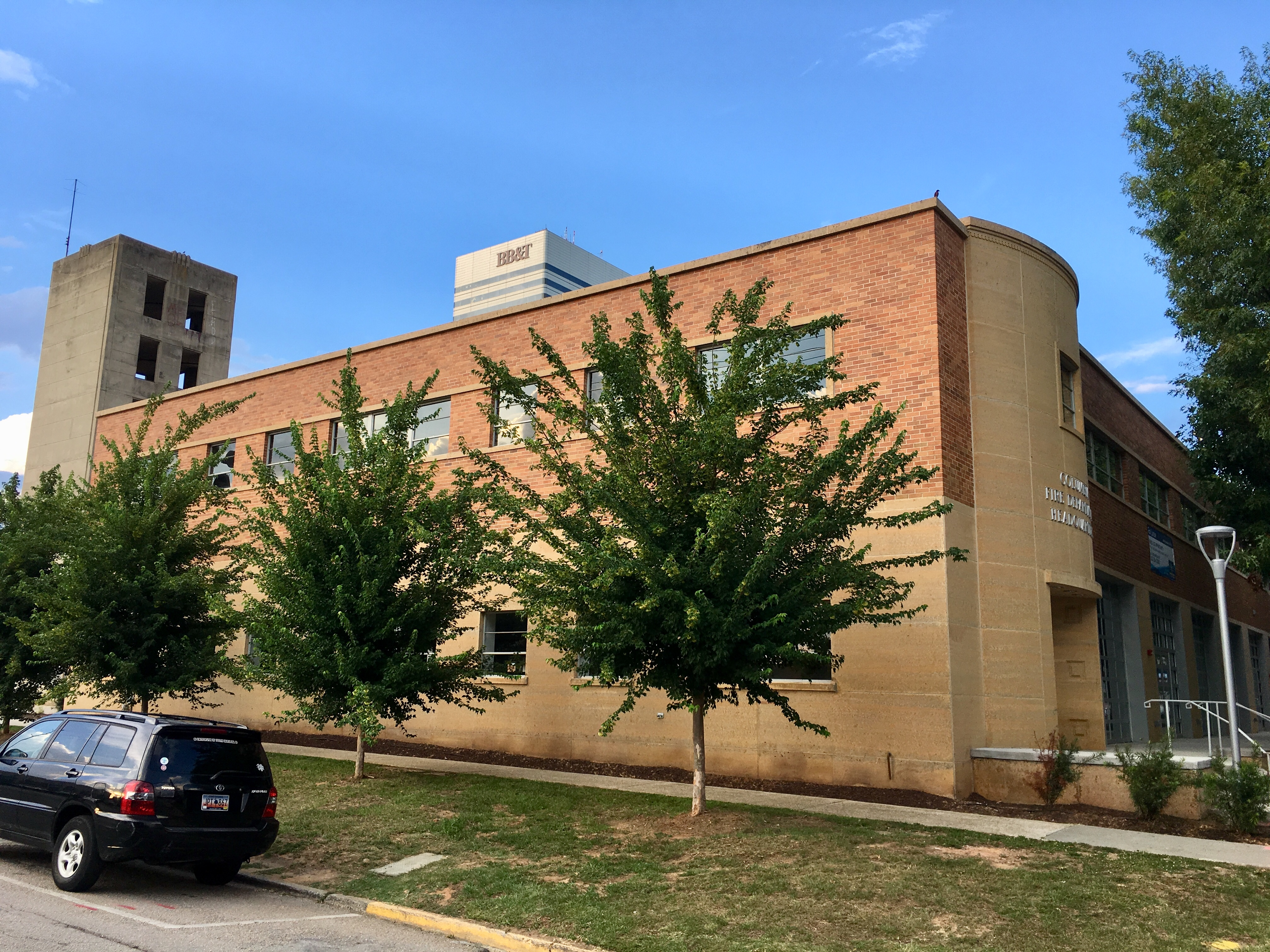

- Location within South Carolina Location within the United States
- Location: 1001 Senate St. Columbia, South Carolina
- Coordinates: 33°59′57″N 81°2′11″W
- Area: less than one acre
- Built: 1949-1951
- Architect: Singley, Heyward
- Architectural style: Moderne, International Style
- NRHP reference No.: 08001396
- Added to NRHP: September 25, 2009

Columbia Central Fire Station, also known as Columbia Fire Department Headquarters and Senate Street Station, is a historic fire station located at Columbia, South Carolina. It was built between 1949 and 1951, and consists of two buildings and a structure. The main building is a two-story, rectangular, brick building in the Moderne / International Style. It has a flat roof and features horizontal bands of windows. The one-story, brick fire truck garage building and the main building were constructed in 1949–1950. The drill tower is a six-story reinforced concrete structure built in 1951. The complex served as the Columbia Fire Department's Headquarters from 1950 until 1995.

It was added to the National Register of Historic Places in 2009.
