= North Columbia Fire Station No. 7 =

- U.S. National Register of Historic Places
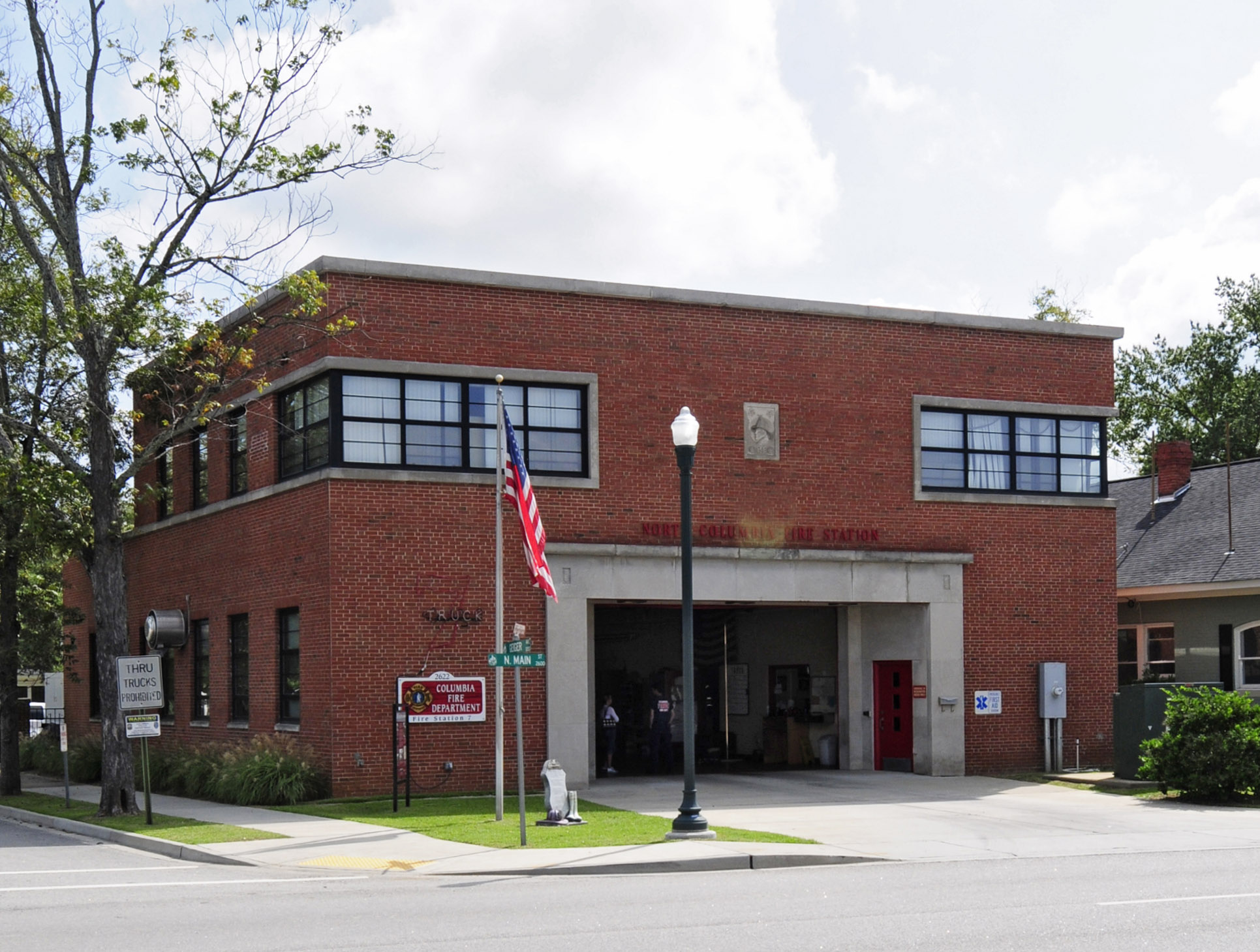
- North Columbia Fire Station, September 2012

- Location within South Carolina Location within the United States
- Location: 2622 N. Main St., Columbia, South Carolina
- Coordinates: 34°1′14″N 81°2′32″W
- Area: less than one acre
- Built: 1948
- Built by: Crosland Construction Co.
- Architect: Singley, Heyward S.
- Architectural style: Moderne, International Style
- NRHP reference No.: 05000518
- Added to NRHP: June 1, 2005

North Columbia Fire Station No. 7 is a historic fire station located at Columbia, South Carolina. It was built in 1948, and is a two-story, brick, transitional Art Moderne / International style building. It features metal window frames, flat roof, and corner ribbon windows.

It was added to the National Register of Historic Places in 2005.
