= La Crosse Pinks =

- 1905–1908; (1905–1912); La Crosse, Wisconsin

Minor league affiliations
- Class: Class D (1905–1912)
- League: Wisconsin State League (1905–1907); Wisconsin-Illinois League (1908); Minnesota-Wisconsin League (1909–1912)

Major league affiliations
- Team: None

Minor league titles
- League titles (2): 1905; 1906

Team data
- Name: La Crosse Pinks (1905–1908); La Crosse Outcasts (1909–1911); La Crosse Outcats (1912)
- Ballpark: League Park (1905–1913)

The La Crosse Pinks were a minor league baseball team based in La Crosse, Wisconsin.

The La Crosse "Pinks" first played under the nickname as members of the Class D level Wisconsin State League from 1905 to 1907. The Pinks continued minor league play the 1908 Wisconsin-Illinois League after the Wisconsin State League changed names. Switching leagues, La Crosse teams played from 1909 to 1912 as charter members of the Class D level Minnesota-Wisconsin League, playing as members until the league folded.

The La Crosse "Pinks" nickname was given to the team after their manager Pink Hawley, who served as the La Crosse manager from 1905 to 1908.

The La Crosse teams hosted minor league home games at League Park.

== History ==
=== 1905 to 1907 Wisconsin State League ===
Minor league baseball began in La Crosse in 1886, when the LaCrosse Freezers played the season as members of the Northwestern League.

In 1905, the Wisconsin State League reformed, and La Crosse joined the league, also called the "Wisconsin Association." The La Crosse "Pinks" began minor league baseball play as members of six–team Class D level Wisconsin State League, with all league teams based in Wisconsin. The Pinks joined the Beloit Collegians, Freeport Pretzels, Green Bay Colts, Oshkosh Indians, and Wausau Lumberjacks teams in league play.

The "Pinks" were nicknamed named after the manager of the team, Pink Hawley. Hawley managed La Crosse from 1905 through the 1908 season. Hawley had moved to La Crosse following his major league career where he opened a cigar store. Hawley also was involved in the organization of the Wisconsin State League.

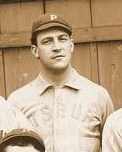
(1896) Pink Hawley, Pittsburgh Pirates. Hawley managed La Crosse from 1905 to 1908 and was the namesake of the "Pinks" nickname of the team.

The 1905 La Crosse Pinks ended their first season of Wisconsin State League play as the league champions. With a record of 68–41, the Pinks placed first in the Wisconsin State League standings, finishing 7.0 games ahead of the second place Oshkosh Indians (60–47). Pink Hawley led the team to the championship as manager.

In their second season of minor league play, the 1906 La Crosse Pinks won their second consecutive championship as members of the six-team Wisconsin State League. The Pinks ended the 1906 season with a 76–42 record, finishing first in the league standings under manager Pink Hawley. La Crosse finished 2.0 games ahead of the second place Freeport Pretzels in the final standings. The La Crosse nickname was continued in reference to manager Pink Hawley.

Frank Schneiberg won 22 games for La Crosse in 1906. His contract was then purchased by the Detroit Tigers for the 1907 season.

The La Crosse continued play as the 1907 Wisconsin State League expanded to eight teams, adding the Madison Senators and Fond du Lac Webfoots as expansion franchises. The league remained classified as a Class D level league. La Crosse ended the Wisconsin State League regular season in third place. With a record of 67–50, playing under manager Pink Hawley, the Pinks finished 10½ games behind the first place Freeport Pretzels in the eight–team league. The 1907 team was also known as the "Badgers." The league had no playoffs, with the regular season first place team winning the championship.

Pinks player Ed Konetchy was a La Crosse native, who was signed by the team after a tryout with Pink Hawley at age 19. Konetchy had played for factory teams in the city as a teenager. St. Louis Cardinals manager John McCloskey sent scouts to La Crosse to evaluate Konetchy. After the scouts recommended Konetchy to McCloskey, His contract was purchased by the St. Louis Cardinals from the La Crosse Pinks during the 1907 season for $1,000. Konetchy then signed a contract with the Cardinals for $275 per month and made his major league debut the next day. After his lengthy major league and career ended with 2,175 hits, Konetchy later returned to his hometown as a manager, leading the 1940 La Crosse Blackhawks to the Wisconsin State League championship.

=== 1908 Wisconsin-Illinois League ===
La Crosse continued play as the Wisconsin State League changed names to become the Wisconsin-Illinois League, remaining a Class D level league. The name change occurred after the Rockford Reds joined the Freeport Pretzels as Illinois based teams in the league.

The 1908 La Crosse Pinks ended the Wisconsin-Illinois League season in third place and finished the season with 66–57 record. The Pinks played just one season in the eight–team Wisconsin-Illinois League in their final season under manager Pink Hawley. The La Crosse Pinks ended the season 7.0 games behind the champion Wausau Lumberjacks.

=== 1909 to 1912 Minnesota-Wisconsin League ===
In 1909, Pink Hawley left La Crosse and became the manager of the Oshkosh Indians, as the La Crosse franchise joined a new league. The 1909 La Crosse "Outcasts" became charter members of the six-team, Class D level Minnesota-Wisconsin League. La Crosse joined with the Duluth White Sox, Eau Claire Puffs, Superior Blues, Wausau Lumberjacks and Winona Pirates teams in the newly formed league.

Beginning play in the new league, La Crosse finished in third place in the Minnesota-Wisconsin League final standings. The Outcasts ended the 1909 season with a record of 69–56 in the six-team league. The 1909 La Crosse manager was Joe Safford, replacing Pink Hawley, as La Crosse ended the season 4½ games behind the first place Duluth White Sox, no playoffs were held. La Crosse player Mike Malloy scored 75 runs to lead the league.

The 1910 Minnesota-Wisconsin-League was expanded to become an eight-team league adding the Red Wing Manufacturers and Rochester Roosters teams. Continuing play in the 1910 eight-team Minnesota-Wisconsin League, the La Crosse Outcasts ended the season in fifth place. La Crosse finished with a record of 56–68, playing the season under manager Joe Safford. The Outcaste ended the season 23½ games behind the first place Eau Claire Commissioners in the final standings.

La Crosse again placed fifth in the 1911 Minnesota-Wisconsin League final standings. The Outcasts ended the season with a record of 47–68 playing under managers Bumpus Jones and Carl Bond. The Superior Red Sox won the championship with a record of 72–46 and finished 28.5 games ahead of fifth place La Crosse.

On May 27, 1912, Baseball Hall of Fame member Burleigh Grimes of the Eau Claire Commissioners pitched against La Crosse at Eau Claire. Grimes defeated La Crosse by the score of 6–2 after the Outcasts committed eight errors in the game. On June 17, 1912, Grimes beat La Crosse again, pitching at Eau Claire and winning 9–2.

Continuing play to begin the 1912 season, the La Crosse "Outcats" played the final season of the Minnesota-Wisconsin League, which reduced to a four-team in the league's final season. On July 1, 1912, the Minnesota-Wisconsin League folded with La Crosse in third place. La Crosse finished 13½ games behind the first place Winona Pirates in the Class D level league. The Outcats ended the season with a record of 15–26 under manager Carl Bond. The Eau Claire Commissioners folded from the league to poor finances due to low attendance. The other league teams were unstable and the remaining league members decided to fold the league.

La Crosse did not have a minor league team to begin the 1913 season but gained a team for a partial season after the season had started. The St. Paul Colts of the Northern League relocated to La Crosse during the season. The Colts moved from St. Paul, Minnesota on July 23, 1913, with a 28–54 record. The team finished the season playing as the La Crosse "Colts" after the relocation. After compiling a 12–24 record while based in La Crosse, the Colts ended the season with an overall record of 40–78 to finish in seventh place in the eight-team league. The La Crosse franchise did not return to the Northern League in 1914.

La Crosse next hosted minor league baseball in 1917, when the La Crosse Infants played the season as members of the Central Association.

== The ballpark ==
The La Crosse teams hosted home minor league games at League Park in La Crosse.

== Timeline ==
Year(s)	# Yrs.	Team	Level	League	Ballpark
1905–1908	4	La Crosse Pinks	Class D	Wisconsin State League	League Park
1909	1	La Crosse Outcasts	Class D	Wisconsin-Illinois League	League Park
1910–1911	2	La Crosse Outcasts	Class D	Minnesota-Wisconsin League	League Park
1912	1	La Crosse Outcats	Class D	Minnesota-Wisconsin League	League Park

== Year-by-year records ==
Year	Record	Finish	Manager	Playoffs/notes
1905	68–41	1st	Pink Hawley	League champions No playoffs held
1906	76–42	1st	Pink Hawley	League champions No playoffs held
1907	67–50	3rd	Pink Hawley	No playoffs held
1908	66–57	3rd	Pink Hawley	No playoffs held
1909	60–56	3rd	Joe Safford	No playoffs held
1910	56–68	5th	Joe Safford	No playoffs held
1911	47–68	5th	Bumpus Jones / Carl Bond	No playoffs held
1912	87–45	5th	Carl Bond	League folded July 1
1913	40–78	7th	Charlie Jones / Frank Kurke	St. Paul (28–54) moved to La Crosse July 23

== Notable alumni ==
- Art Bues (1908)
- Ed Cermak (1907)
- Crazy Dolan (1906)
- Pink Hawley (1905-1908, MGR)
- Bumpus Jones (1912, MGR)
- Ed Konetchy (1905-1907)
- Jeff Pfeffer (1909)
- Frank Schneiberg (1906)
- Bill Schardt (1909)
- Doc Watson (1908-1910)
- Jack Zalusky (1910)

== See also ==
- La Crosse Pinks players
- La Crosse Outcats players
