= Virginia Ore Diggers =

American baseball team (1913–1916)

- 1913–1916; Virginia, Minnesota

Minor league affiliations
- Class: Class C (1913–1916)
- League: Northern League (1913–1916)

Major league affiliations
- Team: None

Minor league titles
- League titles (0): None

Team data
- Name: Virginia Ore Diggers (1913–1916)
- Ballpark: Ewens Field (1913–1916)

The Virginia Ore Diggers were a minor league baseball team based in Virginia, Minnesota. From 1913 to 1916, the "Ore Diggers" played exclusively as members of the Class C level Northern League.

The Virginia Ore Diggers hosted minor league home games at Ewens Field.

Baseball Hall of Fame member Rube Waddell played for the 1913 Virginia Ore Diggers in his last professional season.

== History ==
Virginia hosted semiprofessional teams before hosting minor league baseball. Oscar Graham played for the Virginia, Minnesota team in 1908 with a salary of $350 per month.

In the spring of 1912, a group of Virginia, Minnesota businessmen organized in an attempt to secure a professional baseball team for the city. The group entered into negotiations with several other regional cities who established the Central International League. However, Virginia did not gain a franchise for entry into the league when it formed with four teams for the 1912 season. However, in 1913 an eight–team, Class C level minor league called the "Northern League," was proposed that would include the four 1912 Central International League cities and four other franchises. After the proposal was mobilized, Virginia, Minnesota was admitted into the league.

Minor league baseball play began in Virginia, Minnesota in 1913, when the Virginia Ore Diggers became members of the eight-team Class C level Northern League. The Duluth White Sox, Grand Forks Flickertails, Minneapolis, Minnesota, St. Paul Millers, Superior Red Sox, Winnipeg Maroons and Winona Pirates teams joined Virginia in beginning league play. A Baseball Hall of Fame member would join Virginia during the season.

The Virginia use of the "Ore Diggers" nickname corresponds with the iron ore industry in the region in the era.

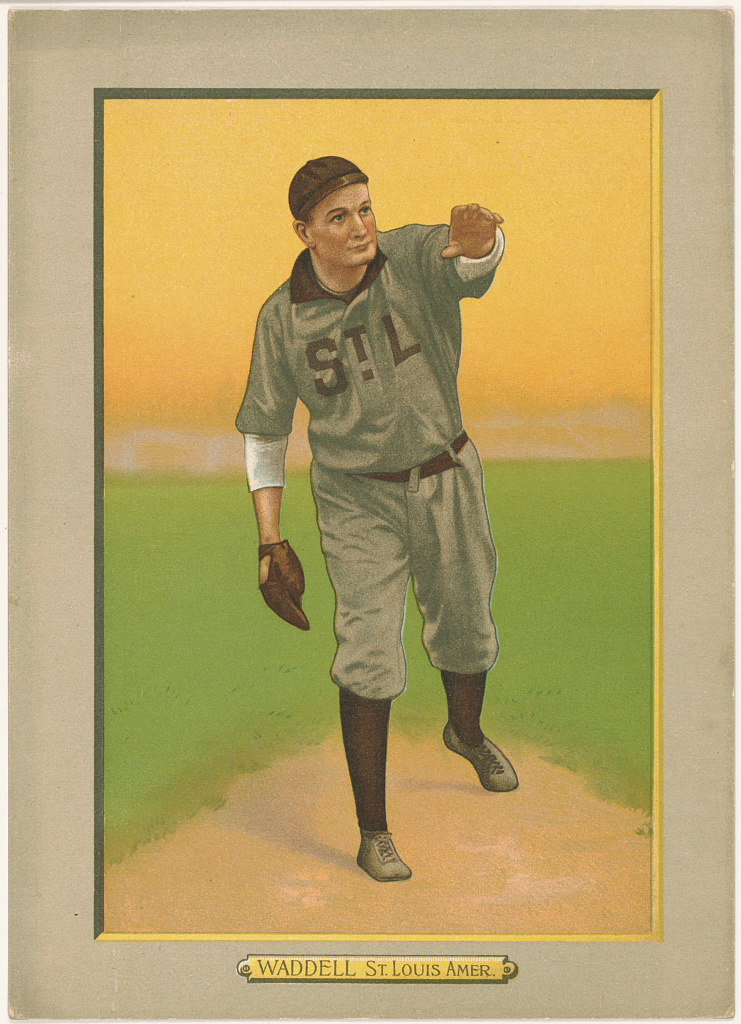
(1911) Baseball Hall of Fame member Rube Waddell, St. Louis Browns. Baseball card. Waddell played for the Virginia Ore Diggers in 1913, a year before his death.

The 1913 opening day home game at Virginia was postponed twice due to rain. April 23, 1913, was the date scheduled as the start of the season, with rain cancelling the game that day and the next. On Friday, April 25, the season opened after the third parade in Virginia in three days was held. The Ore Diggers lost the opener 5–2 to Winnipeg, with the game shortened to eight innings so the Canadian club could catch its train. Virginia started the season with a 1–6 record at home. On July 17, 1913, in a game at home against Minneapolis, the outfield was full of water. A special ground rule was enacted that any ball hit on the fly into the outfield and not caught was to be a ground rule double.

On May 18, 1913, a 36-year-old Rube Waddell joined the Virginia Ore Diggers roster. Waddell was reportedly attracted by the great hunting and fishing reports from nearby Lake Vermillion. Waddell was noted to have regularly played with four bears who would appear at Olcott Park, even naming the bears. Waddell left the team after a game on July 20, 1913, never to return. It marked his last professional appearance in uniform. Waddell died in 1914 from tuberculosis.

When Waddell decided to play for Virginia, he reportedly said to reporters, "There is a great opportunity for the Northern League. The clubs are playing good baseball. Well, I am contented, and I am going to like it fine. I have known (manager) Spike Shannon for years. Well, I am off now to play pool."

In their first season of play, the 1913 Virginia Ore Diggers finished in last place in the Northern League standings. With a record of 30–87, the Ore Diggers finished in eighth place, playing under managers Spike Shannon, Braggo Roth and Edward Stewart. Virginia finished 55.5 games behind the first place Winona Pirates in the final standings. The Ore Diggers were the last team Hall of Famer Rube Waddell would play for. Reportedly, Waddell had a record of 1–8, appearing in 14 games for Virginia.

Virginia continued play in the eight–team 1914 Northern League, finishing the season in fifth place. With a final record of 55–68, the Ore Diggers were managed by Kid Taylor, Frank McGee and John Sundheim while finishing 19.0 games behind the first place Duluth White Sox in the final regular season standings. The league held no playoffs.

The 1915 Virginia Ore Diggers finished in sixth place in the final Northern League standings. The Ore Diggers compiled a record of 53–69 to place sixth in the eight–team league. Playing under returning manager John Sundheim, the Ore Diggers finished 22.5 games behind the first place Fargo-Moorhead Graingrowers in the final standings.

Lefty Davis became manager of the Virginia Ore Diggers in 1916. Davis had previously managed the Winona Pirates of the Northern League in 1913 and 1914. The Ore Diggers folded before the end of the season and didn' reform. The 1916 Northern League reduced two teams to become six–team league after the St. Boniface Saints and Grand Forks Flickertails franchises did not return to begin the league season. On July 10, 1916, Virginia had a record of 28–32 and had won 11 of their previous 16 games, playing under manager Lefty Davis. On July 10, 1916, the Fort William Canadians (22–39) team folded, leaving the league with an uneven five teams. League owners decided another team would be folded and either Virginia or Fargo-Moorhead would be the team. Virginia was folded on July 10, even though the Virginia owners and fans wanted to continue play.

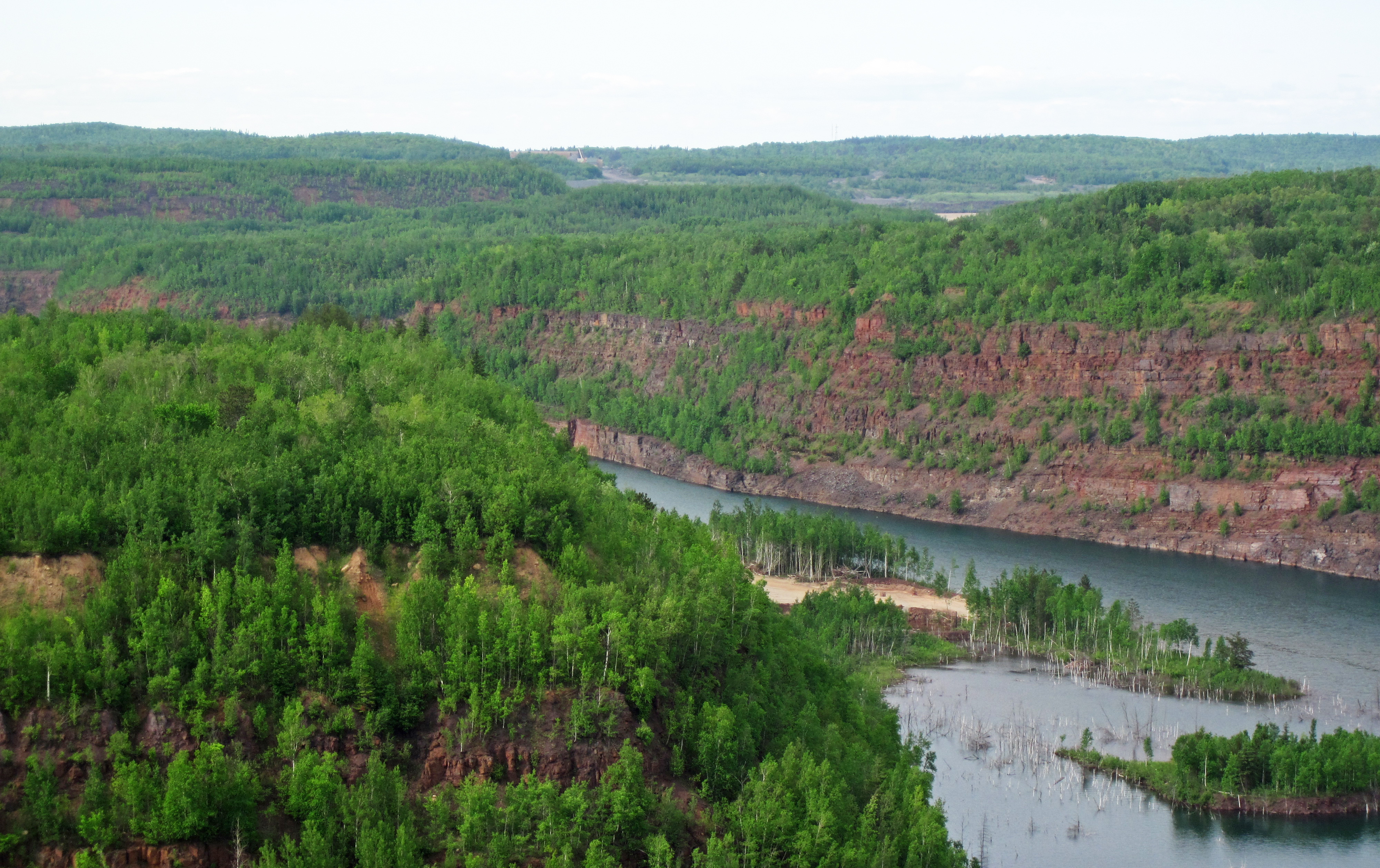
(2015) Biwabik Iron-Formation, Rouchleau Pit. Virginia, Minnesota, USA.

The Northern League continued play in 1917 without a Virginia franchise. Virginia, Minnesota has not hosted another minor league team.

== The ballpark ==
The Virginia Ore Diggers hosted home minor league home games at a ballpark site that was later named Ewens Field. Ewens Field and Stadium was in existence as a high school football and track facility until it was torn down in 2020. The site was renovated to make room for a new city event center facility. Today, the Iron Trail Motors Event Center occupies the site. The center is located at 919 6th Street South in Virginia, Minnesota.

== Timeline ==
Year(s)	# Yrs.	Team	Level	League	Ballpark
1913–1916	4	Virginia Ore Diggers	Class C	Northern League	Ewens Field

== Year–by–year records ==
Year	Record	Finish	Manager	Playoffs/Notes
1913	30–87	8th	Spike Shannon / Braggo Roth / Edward Stewart	No playoffs held
1914	55–68	5th	Kid Taylor / Frank McGee / John Sundheim	No playoffs held
1915	53–69	6th	John Sundheim	No playoffs held
1916	28–32	NA	Lefty Davis	Team disbanded July 10

== Notable alumni ==
- Rube Waddell (1913) Inducted Baseball Hall of Fame, 1946
- Lefty Davis (1916, MGR)
- Tony Faeth (1913–1915)
- Bill McCabe (1915)
- Braggo Roth (1913, MGR) 1915 AL home run leader
- Spike Shannon (1913, MGR)
- Bob Wright (1914–1915)

== See also ==
- Virginia Ore Diggers players
