= Winona A's =

- 1958; Winona, Minnesota

Minor league affiliations
- Class: Class B (1958)
- League: Illinois–Indiana–Iowa League (1958)

Major league affiliations
- Team: Kansas City Athletics (1958)

Minor league titles
- League titles (0): None

Team data
- Name: Winona A's (1958)
- Ballpark: Gabrych Park (1958)

The Winona A's (or interchangeable "Athletics") were a minor league baseball team based in Winona, Minnesota. In 1958, the A's played a partial season in Winona as an affiliate of the Kansas City Athletics in the Class B level Illinois–Indiana–Iowa League ("Three-I League"). The team came into existence during the season, when the newly formed Rochester A's team relocated to Winona on June 29, 1958. The team ended the season in fifth place. Winona hosted home minor league games at Gabrych Park.

== History ==
Winona first hosted minor league baseball in 1877, when the Winona "Clippers" were a member of the League Alliance. Winona, Minnesota previously hosted minor league baseball from 1909 to 1915, with the Winona Pirates teams of the Minnesota–Wisconsin League and Northern League.

Before moving to Winona, the 1958 Rochester A's began play as a new team in the six-team Class D level Illinois–Indiana–Iowa League. The A's were a minor league affiliate of the Kansas City Athletics. The Burlington Bees, Cedar Rapids Braves, Davenport DavSox, Fox Cities Foxes and Green Bay Bluejays teams joined the Rochester A's in beginning Illinois–Indiana–Iowa League play on April 27, 1958.

On June 29, 1958, during the season, the Rochester A's franchise relocated to Winona. The A's had compiled a record of 20–37 at the time of the move. The team continued the season playing as the "Winona A's," compiling a 37–36 record while based in Winona. With an overall record of 57–73, the A's placed fifth in the Illinois–Indiana–Iowa League. Playing the season under managers Burl Storie, Leverette Spencer and Lew Krausse, the A's finished 20.0 games behind the first place Cedar Rapids Braves (77–53) in the final regular season standings. The A's did not qualify for the playoff, where Cedar Rapids defeated the second place Davenport DavSox in the Finals. A's pitcher Stan Horvatin led the league with 210 strikeouts. Overall, the A's had a strong offense and led the Illinois–Indiana–Iowa League with both 761 runs scored and 147 home runs. The A's also pitchers also surrendered 764 total runs, most in the league. Richard Rogers led the A's team with 27 home runs.

While based in Rochester, the A's drew 27,364 fans, playing home games at Mayo Field and 12,495 based in Winona for a total of 39,589 for the season. The Winona A's played home games at Gabrych Park.

Winona did not return to play in the 1959 Illinois–Indiana–Iowa League, as the league expanded to eight teams. Winona has not hosted another minor league team.

== The ballpark ==
The Winona A's hosted minor league home games at Gabrych Park. Today, the ballpark is still in use, located at 950 East 7th Street in Winona. The ballpark was named for Gene Gabrych.

== Year–by–year record ==
Year	Record	Finish	Manager	Attendance	Playoffs/Notes
1958	57–73	5th	Burl Storie / Leverette Spencer / Lew Krausse	39,589	Did not qualify Rochester (20–37) moved to Winona June 29.

== Notable alumni ==
- Dave Hill (1958)
- Dick Howser (1958) Kansas City Royals Hall of Fame
- Lew Krausse (1958, MGR)
- Gordon Mackenzie (1958)
- Dan Pfister (1958)
- Leo Posada (1958)
- Hal Raether (1958)

== See also ==
Rochester/Winona A's players
