= Rochester A's =

- 1958; Rochester, Minnesota

Minor league affiliations
- Class: Class B (1958)
- League: Illinois–Indiana–Iowa League (1958)

Major league affiliations
- Team: Kansas City Athletics (1958)

Minor league titles
- League titles (0): None

Team data
- Name: Rochester A's (1958)
- Ballpark: Mayo Field (1958)

The Rochester A's (or interchangeable "Athletics") were a minor league baseball team based in Rochester, Minnesota. In 1958, the A's played a partial season as an affiliate of the Kansas City Athletics in the Class B level Illinois–Indiana–Iowa League ("Three-I League"). Rochester relocated to Winona, Minnesota on June 29, 1958, and the combined team finished in fifth place. Rochester hosted home minor league games at Mayo Field.

== History ==
Rochester, Minnesota previously hosted minor league baseball from 1910 to 1912. The Rochester Roosters in 1910, Rochester Bears in 1911 and Rochester Bugs in 1912 played as members of the Minnesota–Wisconsin League.

Before moving to Winona, the Rochester A's began play in the Illinois–Indiana–Iowa League, which played as a six–team league that season. The A's were a minor league affiliate of the Kansas City Athletics. The Burlington Bees, Cedar Rapids Braves, Davenport DavSox, Fox Cities Foxes and Green Bay Bluejays joined Rochester in beginning 1958 league play on April 27, 1958.

On June 29, 1958, the Rochester A's had compiled a record of 20–37 when the franchise relocated to Winona. The team ended the season as the "Winona A's," compiling a 37–36 record while based in Winona. With an overall record of 57–73, the A's placed fifth in the Illinois–Indiana–Iowa League. Playing the season under managers Burl Storie, Leverette Spencer and Lew Krausse, The A's finished 20.0 games behind the first place Cedar Rapids Braves (77–53) in the final regular season standings. Cedar Rapids then defeated the second place Davenport DavSox in the Finals. A's pitcher Stan Horvatin led the league with 210 strikeouts. Overall, the A's led the Illinois–Indiana–Iowa League with 761 runs scored and 147 home runs. The A's surrendered 764 runs, most in the league. Richard Rogers led the team with 27 home runs.

While based in Rochester, the A's drew 27,364 fans, playing home games at Mayo Field and 39,589 total for the season. The Winona A's played home games at Gabyrch Field.

Rochester, Minnesota was without minor league baseball until 1993, when the Rochester Aces played a single year in Rochester as members of the independent level Northern League.

== The ballpark ==
The Rochester A's played minor league home games at Mayo Field. Today, the park is still in use, located at 403 East Center Street in Rochester. Today, the Rochester Honkers continue baseball play at Mayo Field.

== Year–by–year record ==
Year	Record	Finish	Manager	Attendance	Playoffs/Notes
1958	57–73	5th	Burl Storie / Leverette Spencer / Lew Krausse	39,589	Did not qualify Rochester (20–37) moved to Winona June 29.

== Notable alumni ==
- Dave Hill (1958)
- Dick Howser (1958) Kansas City Royals Hall of Fame
- Lew Krausse (1958, MGR)
- Gordon Mackenzie (1958)
- Dan Pfister (1958)
- Leo Posada (1958)
- Hal Raether (1958)

== See also ==
Rochester/Winona A's players
