= East Grand Forks Colts =

American baseball team (1933–1933)

- 1933; East Grand Forks, Minnesota

Minor league affiliations
- Class: Class D (1933)
- League: Northern League (1933)

Major league affiliations
- Team: None

Minor league titles
- League titles (0): None

Team data
- Name: East Grand Forks Colts (1933)
- Ballpark: East Side Park (1933)

The East Grand Forks Colts were a minor league baseball team based in East Grand Forks, Minnesota. In 1933, the Colts played the season as members of the Class D level Northern League, finishing the season in sixth place.

The East Grand Forks Colts hosted minor league home games at East Side Park in their only season of play.

The franchise evolved to become the neighboring Grand Forks Chiefs in 1934, after a new ballpark was constructed in Grand Forks.

== History ==
East Grand Forks, Minnesota began minor league baseball play in 1933, when the East Grand Forks "Colts" became members of the Class D level Northern League, which had reformed as a seven–team league. Other members joining East Grand Forks in the 1933 Northern League were the Brainerd Muskies, Crookston Pirates, Eau Claire Cardinals, Fargo-Moorhead Twins, Superior Blues and Winnipeg Maroons. An eighth team, to have been based in Little Falls, Minnesota, folded before the season began. League teams often filled their open dates with games against local amateur teams.

The 1933 Colts team was owned by Russell L. Voelz, a Minneapolis, Minnesota salesman, who also initially served as president of the Northern League. It was noted the Colts became based in East Grand Forks due to neighboring Grand Forks, North Dakota not having a suitable ballpark in 1933. Businessmen of East Grand Forks offered to construct a new grandstand and provide the city ballpark to Voelz to host the team. The team was reported to have received over 400 applications from aspiring players, with over 200 players reporting for the Colts' spring training. Voelz was removed as president of the league during the season and filed a lawsuit, which was settled for $140.00.

On opening day 1933, the East Grand Forks Chiefs defeated Eau Claire 11–4 in the contest at Eau Claire. The game was attended by a crowd of 2,000.

On July 3, 1933, John Anderson was released as the East Grand Forks manager and replaced by John Vanusek. After his firing as manager, Anderson bought the controlling interest in the team, became the club president and named himself manager again.

After beginning play on May 4, 1933, the East Grand Forks Colts finished the season with an overall record of 50–55, placing sixth in the Northern League final overall standings. The Colts played the season under managers Johnny Anderson and John Vanusek. It was noted their main rival was the Crookston Pirates. The Northern league played a split–season schedule. The Colts had a record of 24–23 in the first–half, placing third in the seven–team league. East Grand Forks then placed sixth in the second–half standings with a 26–32 record. Overall, the Colts were outscored by their opponents 626–565. The "consensus" All–Star team picked by the Spalding Guide had one Colt on the team: Ray Helixon. Player/manager Johnny Anderson hit .403 to lead win the Northern League in batting title.

The 1933 East Grand Forks Colts finished 13.5 games behind first place Winnipeg in the overall standings. The final Northern League overall standings were led by the Winnipeg Maroons (67–44), followed by the Superior Blues (60–49), Brainerd Muskies/Brandon Grays (55–46), East Grand Forks Colts (50–55), Eau Claire Cardinals (52–45), Crookston Pirates (48–48) and Fargo-Moorhead Twins (30–75). Playing a split–season schedule, Superior won the first–half standings and Brainerd/Brandon won the second–half standings. Superior won the playoff series to claim the championship.

After the 1933 season, the East Grand Forks based franchise did not return to the 1934 Northern League, which added the Duluth Dukes to expand to eight teams. The Colts franchise relocated to neighboring Grand Forks, North Dakota and became the Grand Forks Chiefs for the 1934 season, with John Anderson continuing as manager.

Linus Ebnet, a player on the 1933 East Grand Forks Chiefs and 1934 Grand Forks Chiefs, was killed in 1938 at age 23. Ebnet was struck in the head by a pitch while playing for the Winnipeg Maroons and died in the hospital four days later.

Paul Schaefer, a pitcher for the 1933 Chiefs, was signed during the season by the integrated Bismarck Churchills team by its owner Neil Churchill.

East Grand Forks, Minnesota has not hosted another minor league team.

== The ballpark ==
The East Grand Forks Colts hosted 1933 minor league home games at East Side Park. The ballpark was noted to have a distinctive, short left field fence. Due to Sunday laws in Grand Forks, North Dakota, the ballpark also hosted Sunday games and other games for the Grand Fork Chiefs after the Colts franchise had relocated to Grand Forks in 1934.

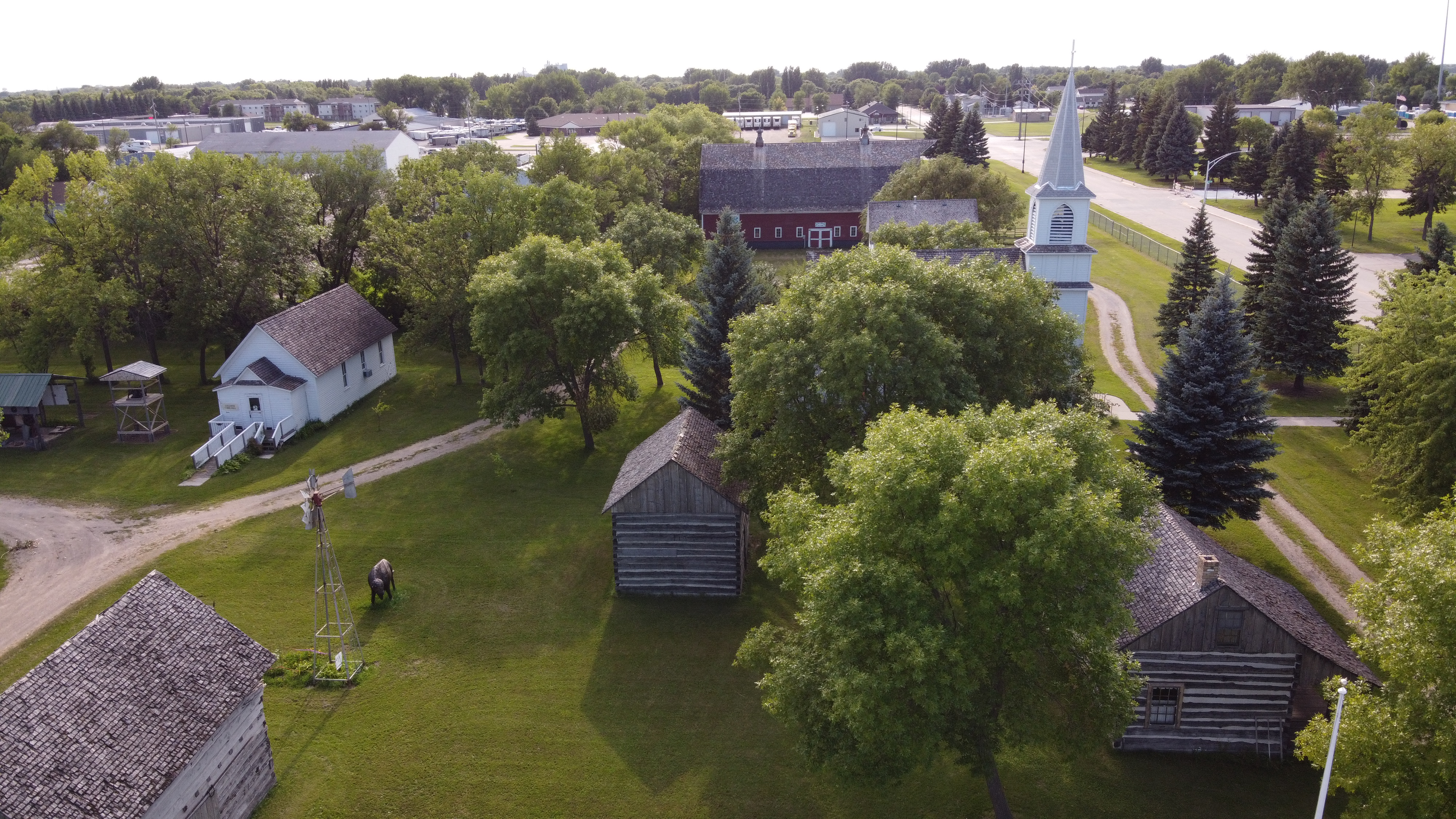
(2020) East Grand Forks Heritage Village, East Grand Forks, Minnesota

== Year–by–year record ==
Year	Record	Finish	Manager	Playoffs/Notes
1933	50–55	6th	Johnny Anderson / John Vanusek	Did not qualify

== Notable alumni ==
No 1933 East Grand Forks Colts' alumni advanced to the major leagues.

== See also ==
List of baseball players who died during their careers
