= Hooks Dauss =

American baseball player (1889–1963)

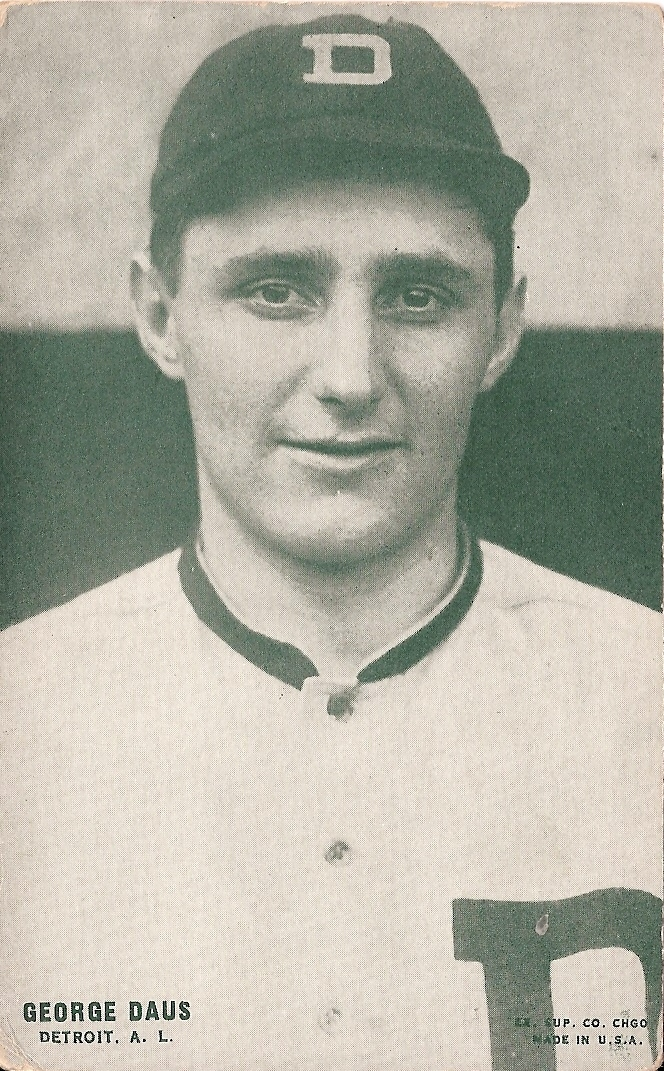
- Dauss in 1909
- Pitcher
- Born: September 22, 1889; Indianapolis, Indiana, U.S.
- Died: July 27, 1963 (aged 73); St. Louis, Missouri, U.S.
- Batted: Right Threw: Right

MLB debut
- September 28, 1912, for the Detroit Tigers

Last MLB appearance
- September 19, 1926, for the Detroit Tigers

MLB statistics
- Win–loss record: 223–182
- Earned run average: 3.30
- Strikeouts: 1,201
- Stats at Baseball Reference

Teams
- Detroit Tigers (1912–1926)

George August "Hooks" Dauss (born George August Daus; (Note: Dauss added an extra "s" to the end of his surname prior to beginning his major league career.) September 22, 1889 – July 27, 1963) was an American professional baseball player from 1909 to 1926. He played 15 seasons of Major League Baseball as a right-handed pitcher for the Detroit Tigers from 1912 to 1926. He was given the nickname "Hooks", because his curveball was hard to hit. He compiled a career record of 223–182 with a 3.30 earned run average (ERA). His best years were 1915 when he had a 24–13 record, 1919 with a 21–9 record, and 1923 with a 21–13 record. Dauss's 223 wins are still the most for a pitcher in Tigers franchise history, and he is one of only 14 pitchers to record at least 200 wins all with one team.

== Early years ==
Dauss was born in Indianapolis, Indiana, in 1889. His parents were John Dauss, a machinist, and Anna E. (Magel) Dauss, a native of Indiana. He had two older brothers, Raymond and Edward. His parents divorced when he was a child, and he was living with his mother and grandparents at the time of the 1900 Census.

Dauss attended the Emmerich Manual High School in Indianapolis. Dauss first gained note as a pitcher on the Manual High School baseball team.

== Professional baseball career ==
=== Minors ===
Dauss began his professional baseball career in 1908 with the South Bend, Indiana team in the Central League. However, manager Aggie Grant released Dauss before he even appeared in a game. He did pitch an exhibition game, a shutout against the Duluth White Sox of the Northern League. Dauss then signed to play with Duluth in 1909.

In his first full season of professional baseball, Dauss compiled a 19–10 record in 33 games. He appeared only 18 games for Duluth in 1910, compiling a 7–7 record. Dauss pitched for the Winona Pirates in the Class C Minnesota–Wisconsin League during the 1911 season. He compiled a 22–12 record and 2.13 earned run average (ERA) with Winona. Dauss was next acquired by the St. Paul Saints of the Class AA American Association. He compiled a 12–19 record for the Saints in 1912.

=== Detroit Tigers ===
==== 1912–1915 ====
Deacon McGuire, then a scout for the Detroit Tigers, saw Dauss pitch in St. Paul during the 1912 season. Detroit team president Frank Navin tried unsuccessfully to draft Dauss and ended up purchasing him from St. Paul in September 1912. Dauss made his major league debut on September 28, 1912, pitching a four-hit complete game victory over the Cleveland Naps despite giving up eight bases on balls and hitting three batsmen -- Shoeless Joe Jackson having been struck twice. Dauss compiled a 1–1 record and 3.18 ERA in his two appearances at the end of the Tigers 1912 season.

In February 1913, Dauss signed a contract with the Tigers for the 1913 season. He became a regular in Detroit's starting rotation, a position he would hold for the next 14 years. In his first full season in the majors, Dauss started 29 games and compiled a 13–12 record, 2.48 ERA, 22 complete games, and 107 strikeouts. He also finished the 1913 season ranked ninth in the American League with a 7.5 hits per nine innings pitched. Eddie Onslow, who was a catcher for the Tigers in 1912 and 1913, said Dauss was "fast and had a good curve." Detroit manager Hughie Jennings praised Dauss after the 1913 season: "I consider Dauss to be by far the best young pitcher in the American League and I am not alone in this belief. Clark Griffith, of the Nationals, was one of the first of opposing managers to recognize in Dauss a coming star."

Prior to the start of the 1914 season, Dauss and fellow Indianapolis native Donie Bush (Detroit's shortstop) were recruited to play as hometown talent for the Indianapolis team in the newly formed Federal League. In mid-January 1914, Dauss and Bush issued a joint statement that they had refused the Federal League offer and returned their signed contracts back to Detroit; both also indicated they had received increases in their 1913 salaries.

During the 1914 season, Dauss became a workhorse for the Tigers, appearing in 45 games and 302 innings pitched. He improved his record to 19–15 and had a 2.86 ERA. He finished among the American League's leaders with 22 complete games (3rd), 19 wins (4th), 302 innings pitched (4th), and 150 strikeouts (5th). However, he also led the league with 98 earned runs allowed and 18 hit batsmen. Dauss actually hit three batters in one game on August 24, 1914. He and four Washington Senators pitchers combined to set a record with seven hit batsmen in a game: Dauss hit three, and Washington pitchers hit four. The Tigers won 11–0.

In 1915, Hooks had the best season of his career, as the Tigers compiled a 100–54 record, narrowly losing the American League pennant to the Boston Red Sox. Dauss appeared in 46 games (309 2/3 innings) for the 1915 Tigers, compiling a 24–13 record with a 2.50 ERA. For the second consecutive season, Dauss was among the American League's leaders in multiple categories with 24 wins (2nd), 309 2/3 innings pitched (3rd), 27 complete games (3rd), and 132 strikeouts (8th). Dauss also developed into one of the best fielding pitchers in the game during the 1915 season. He led the league's pitchers with 137 assists and a range factor of 4.30 per nine innings pitched.

In a display of dedication to baseball, Dauss was married to Miss Ollie Speake in the morning of May 29, 1915, asked the clerk to delay making an entry in his books, and insisted that the Justice place newspapers over the windows in his office during the ceremony. Dauss then pitched for the Tigers that afternoon, explaining his zest for privacy on the ground that he thought he would be nervous if the crowd knew he had just been married.

==== 1916–1922 ====
During the 1916 season, Dauss's ERA jumped nearly a full point to 3.21 (from 2.50 the prior year). His playing time was reduced somewhat to 238 2/3 innings pitched, but he still compiled a solid 19–12 record, and his 19 wins was fifth best in the American League. As he had in 1914, Dauss again led the league with 16 hit batsmen in 1916.

During spring training in 1917, Dauss's performance raised concerns. Sports writer E. A. Batchelor wrote:

"There is no use trying to dodge the somber truth, Dauss does not look good. Now and then he has shown his famous curve with as quick a break as it ever had, but he hasn't had a fast ball that would dent a felt hat."

Despite the concerns expressed in the spring, Dauss brought his ERA down to 2.43 in 1917 and won 17 games—the seventh highest tally in the American League.

During spring training in 1918, Detroit manager Hughie Jennings opined that lack of confidence and a "carefree manner" was holding Dauss back from stardom. The Detroit Free Press reported:

"Were George Dauss possessed of the proper spirit, it is Manager Jennings's profound belief that the little curver would take rank with the greatest hurlers that ever sunk a spiked shoe in the rubber of a major league pitching mound. . . . Nothing appears to ruffle Dauss; he takes a victory or defeat with the same measure of unconcern . . With half as much fight as Cobb displays, or any one of a half a dozen of his teammates, he would be the equal of men like Christy Mathewson . . . 'If George could only say to himself, now I am as good as Mathewson, he would be the best pitcher in the major leagues today. . . . There isn't anything any other pitcher ever had that George has not got,' Hughie mused, 'but confidence in himself. Half the battle is self assurance.'"

Dauss went on to compile his first losing record (12–16) in his major league career. However, Dauss's 1918 record was more a reflection of the collapse of the Detroit team as a whole. After winning 100 games in 1915, the 1918 team compiled a 55–71 record and finished seventh in American League.

In 1919, Dauss rebounded and had his second 20-win season in the major leagues. Despite playing for a fourth place team, Dauss compiled a 21–9 for a career best .700 winning percentage. He ranked among the league leaders with 21 wins (4th), 22 complete games (7th), and 256 1/3 innings pitched (10th). He also posted impressive fielding numbers, leading the league's pitchers with 101 assists.

Despite a nearly identical ERA, Dauss's record plummeted to 13–21 on a bad Tigers team in 1920. He followed with two more mediocre seasons in 1921 and 1922.

==== 1922–1926 ====
On September 10, 1925, in the first game of a doubleheader, Dauss and the Tigers beat the Cleveland Indians, 6–1; this gave Dauss his 210th win in a Detroit uniform, surpassing George Mullin's 209. Dauss has held the Tigers record for pitcher wins ever since (101 years as of 2026), and is likely to continue to hold the mark for some time to come. (The only pitcher to come close to Dauss in recent years is Justin Verlander, who won 183 games for the Tigers before being traded to the Houston Astros in 2017. Verlander re-signed with the Tigers in February 2026, but the 42-year-old still needs 40 more wins as a Tiger to match Dauss.)

==== Career totals/records ====
Dauss finished his career with a record of 223–182 and a 3.30 ERA in 538 games (388 starts). Dauss also has career totals of 1,201 strikeouts and 3,390 2/3 innings pitched. As a batter, he compiled a .189 batting average.

Dauss was also an excellent fielding pitcher, with a career range factor of 2.28, 65 points higher than the average pitcher of his era. His career total of 1,128 assists as a pitcher ranks 14th in major league history. His career fielding percentage of .967 was also 19 points higher than the average pitcher of his era. In the combined 1923 and 1924 seasons, Dauss was charged with only one error in 90 games.

== Family and later years ==
Dauss was married in May 1915 to Ollie Speake of St. Louis.

From 1945 until the time of his death, Dauss lived in Fenton, Missouri. He died after a long illness in 1963 at Firmin Desloge Hospital in St. Louis, Missouri at age 73.

== See also ==
- Detroit Tigers team records
- List of Major League Baseball career wins leaders
- List of Major League Baseball annual saves leaders
- List of Major League Baseball players who spent their entire career with one franchise
- List of Major League Baseball career hit batsmen leaders
