= Sherburn Park =

Baseball stadium in Winnipeg, Canada (1924–1942)

- Interactive map of Sherburn Park
- Former names: Happyland Park
- Coordinates: 49°53′4.3″N 97°10′33.7″W
- Capacity: 3,500
- Type: Baseball stadium
- Event: Sports venue

Construction
- Opened: 6 June 1924; 102 years ago
- Closed: 1942

Tenant
- Winnipeg Maroons

Sherburn Park was a baseball stadium in Winnipeg, Manitoba, located at the corner of Sherburn Street at Portage Avenue, on the very same site as the former Happyland Park. It was the second home of the Winnipeg Maroons of the Northern League. It had a seating capacity of 3,500.

The baseball and lacrosse stadium opened on June 7,1924, with an initial lacrosse match between the Tamanny Tigers and the Fort Rouge Forts. Opening day attendance was 1,000 spectators.

== Incidents ==
On August 27, 1936 during a baseball game between the Maroons and the Superior Blues, a fatal injury occurred when the baseball hit Blues' George Tkach's jaw.

On July 16, 1938 while the Maroons were playing in a double header against the Grand Forks Chiefs, Maroons' shortstop Linus "Skeeter" Ebret was struck at the end of the first inning of the second game that took place during the evening and died soon afterwards.
