= Happyland Park =

Amusement park in Winnipeg, Canada (1906–1922)

- Interactive map of Happyland Park
- Location: Winnipeg, Manitoba, Canada
- Coordinates: 49°52′54″N 97°10′36″W
- Status: Defunct
- Opened: May 23, 1906; 120 years ago
- Closed: 1922; 104 years ago
- Operated by: American Park Company
- Area: 32 acres (13 ha)

Attractions
- Total: 6
- Roller coasters: 1
- Water rides: 0
- Other rides: 6

Happyland Park was an amusement park in Winnipeg, Manitoba, Canada.

Construction started on May 1, 1906, on 13 hectares (32 acres) of land between Aubrey and Dominion streets. Portage Avenue bounded it to the north and the Assiniboine River was to the south. Today this area is part of the Wolseley neighbourhood of Winnipeg. The total cost to construct the park was about $150,000 and were illuminated by 12,000 lights. The main side of the park fronted 90 metres (98 yards) of the south side of Portage Avenue with a high wooden fence sporting the word "Happyland" and advertisements detailing the amusements to be found inside. The park opened to the public on May 23, 1906.

The main attraction at Happyland Park was the baseball games. The Winnipeg Maroons would play American teams of the Northern League from Duluth, Grand Forks, Fargo, etc. The first game, attended by 4,000 fans, was held on May 24, 1906. It saw the home team lose 7 to 5 to the visiting Duluth team. The park also had a rollercoaster, two carousels, rifle range, roller rink, ballroom, hippodrome, Japanese tea gardens, picnic areas, a theatre, temple of laughter, ferris wheel, ye old mill, an aerial swing, palace of illusions, tour of California, Edisonia, Chateua Alphonse, and an athletic area. By 1914, the owners of the park had sold off a portion of the land for private residential development.

The park closed in 1922. Another park of the same name exists today in St. Boniface.

In Guy Maddin's My Winnipeg, the signage and other materials are used in a rooftop homeless encampment.
