= Braggo Roth =

American baseball player (1892–1936)

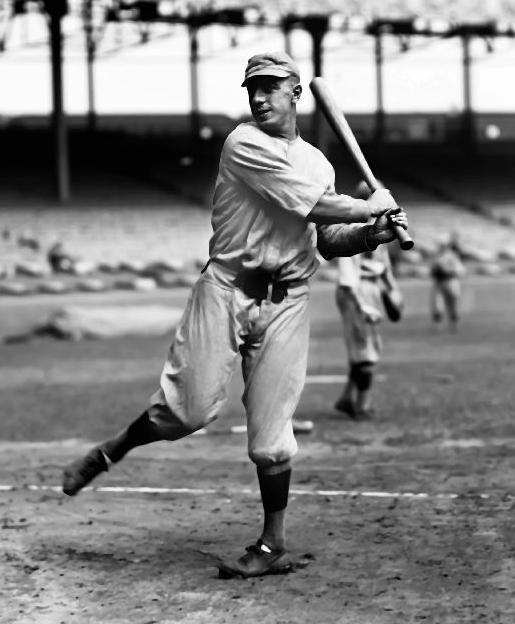
- Roth in 1919
- Right fielder
- Born: August 28, 1892; Burlington, Wisconsin, U.S.
- Died: September 11, 1936 (aged 44); Chicago, Illinois, U.S.
- Batted: Right Threw: Right

MLB debut
- September 1, 1914, for the Chicago White Sox

Last MLB appearance
- October 1, 1921, for the New York Yankees

MLB statistics
- Batting average: .284
- Home runs: 30
- Runs batted in: 422
- Stats at Baseball Reference

Teams
- Chicago White Sox (1914–1915); Cleveland Indians (1915–1918); Philadelphia Athletics (1919); Boston Red Sox (1919); Washington Senators (1920); New York Yankees (1921)

Career highlights and awards
- AL home run leader (1915)

Robert Frank Roth (August 28, 1892 – September 11, 1936), nicknamed Braggo, was an American professional baseball outfielder. He played in Major League Baseball over parts of eight seasons with the Chicago White Sox, Cleveland Indians, Philadelphia Athletics, Boston Red Sox, Washington Senators, and New York Yankees.

== Early life ==
Robert Frank Roth was born in Burlington, Wisconsin, on August 28, 1892. Roth's parents resided in Chicago, but vacationed in Burlington each summer at his mother's brother's house on the Fox River. Roth's brother, Frank, was 14 years older than Bobby. He was a catcher in the major leagues between 1903 and 1910.

== Baseball career ==
Braggo began his minor league career in 1910 with the Green Bay Bays of the Class-D Wisconsin–Illinois League. After less than three months, Roth was released and he signed with the Red Wing Manufacturers of the Class-D Minnesota–Wisconsin League. In 1912, he played for the St. Joseph Drummers of the Western League. He played for the Kansas City Blues of the American Association in 1913 and 1914. Roth played third base for the first four years of his career, but was converted into an outfielder in 1914. He also earned the nickname "Braggo" during the 1914 season due to his boastful attitude about hitting.

Roth made his MLB debut with the Chicago White Sox of the American League, when they purchased him from the Blues in August 1914. He was switched back to third base, but his playing time decreased in 1915 due to his poor defensive play and the acquisition of Eddie Murphy, resulting in the White Sox trading Roth with a player to be named later (later decided to be Larry Chappell), Ed Klepfer and $31,500 to the Cleveland Indians for Shoeless Joe Jackson in August 1915. Roth hit three home runs in the final week of the 1915 season to increase his season total to seven, one more than Rube Oldring.

Braggo struck out often, leading the American League in strikeouts in 1917, and finishing among the leaders four other times. However, he also drew decent numbers of walks for the times, with a lifetime .367 on-base percentage. He was several times among the stolen base leaders, finishing as high as second in the league in 1918. He led the league in hit-by-pitch in 1918 and was two other times among the leaders.

With the Indians seeking pitching, they traded Roth to the Philadelphia Athletics for Larry Gardner, Charlie Jamieson and Elmer Myers before the 1919 season. However, Roth's loud personality clashed with the reserved Connie Mack, so Mack traded Roth with Red Shannon to the Boston Red Sox for Jack Barry and Amos Strunk in June 1919.

Before the 1920 season, the Red Sox traded Roth and Shannon to the Washington Senators for Eddie Foster, Harry Harper, and Mike Menosky. Roth had his best season of his career with the Senators, with 92 RBI. After the season, he was traded by the Senators to the New York Yankees for Duffy Lewis and George Mogridge.

Roth missed a substantial portion of the 1921 season with a knee injury. Before the 1922 season, Roth declared his knee fit for play, but the Yankees released him due to his knee injury, which did not respond to treatment. In 1923, Roth played for the Blues and St. Paul Saints, also of the American Association. He played for the Hollywood Stars of the Pacific Coast League in 1928.

In 811 games over eight seasons in the major leagues, Roth posted a .284 batting average (804-for-2,831) with 427 runs, 30 home runs, 422 runs batted in, and 190 stolen bases.

== Death ==
Roth died in an automobile accident with a newspaper truck at the age of 44 in Chicago on September 11, 1936.

== See also ==
- List of Major League Baseball annual home run leaders
