= Lew Krausse =

Lewis Bernard Krausse were father and son Major League Baseball pitchers:

- Lew Krausse Sr. (1912–1988) played between 1931 and 1932
- Lew Krausse Jr. (1943–2021) played between 1961 and 1974
