= Bob Strampe =

American baseball player (born 1950)

- Pitcher
- Born: June 13, 1950 (age 76); Janesville, Wisconsin, U.S.
- Batted: Both Threw: Right

MLB debut
- May 10, 1972, for the Detroit Tigers

Last MLB appearance
- September 19, 1972, for the Detroit Tigers

MLB statistics
- Earned run average: 11.57
- Record: 0-0
- Strikeouts: 4
- Stats at Baseball Reference

Teams
- Detroit Tigers (1972)

Robert Edwin Strampe (/ˈstræmp/ STRAMP; born June 13, 1950) is an American former professional baseball player and coach. He played in Major League Baseball as a right-handed pitcher in 1972 for the Detroit Tigers.

== Career ==
Strampe was drafted by the Tigers in the 18th round (414th overall) of the 1968 Major League Baseball draft. In the 1969 season, he played for the Batavia Trojans and pitched 115 innings, and went 10-5 with 138 strikeouts and a 2.97 ERA.

He made his major league debut May 10, 1972 against the Chicago White Sox. He came in as a relief pitcher for Ron Perranoski, giving up four hits and a walk and allowing in four earned runs before being pulled.

Overall, he pitched in seven Major League games in 1972, with an ERA of 11.57 across 4 2/3 innings, allowing six hits, seven walks, six earned runs, and four strikeouts. He played his final big league game on September 19 of that year, before being demoted back to the minors for the rest of his career.

In 1974, Strampe, Ed Brinkman and Dick Sharon were traded from the Tigers to the San Diego Padres for Nate Colbert in a three-team deal on November 18, 1974.

== Personal life ==
Strampe was born in Janesville, Wisconsin, where he attended Janesville High School.

Since at least the late 1990s, Strampe has resided in Cheney, Washington, where he was an assistant baseball coach for the local high school.

Strampe's father, Bob Strampe, Sr., pitched in the minor leagues in 1934 for the Fargo-Moorhead Twins and Brainerd-Little Falls Muskies.
