= Joe Sommer =

American baseball player (1858–1938)

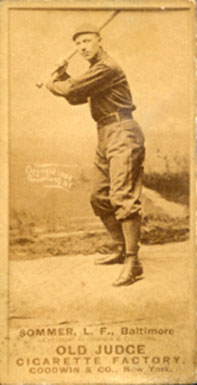
- Outfielder
- Born: November 20, 1858; Covington, Kentucky, U.S.
- Died: January 16, 1938 (aged 79); Cincinnati, Ohio, U.S.
- Batted: Right Threw: Right

MLB debut
- July 8, 1880, for the Cincinnati Stars

Last MLB appearance
- October 15, 1890, for the Baltimore Orioles

MLB statistics
- Batting average: .248
- Home runs: 11
- Runs batted in: 342
- Stats at Baseball Reference

Teams
- Cincinnati Stars (1880); Cincinnati Red Stockings (1882); Baltimore Orioles (1884–1889); Cleveland Spiders (1890); Baltimore Orioles (1890)

Joseph John Sommer (November 20, 1858 – January 16, 1938) was an American professional baseball outfielder. He played in Major League Baseball (MLB) from 1880 to 1890 for the Cincinnati Stars, Cincinnati Red Stockings, Baltimore Orioles, and Cleveland Spiders.

Sommer and Jimmy Macullar unsuccessfully attempted to engineer the departure of Pop Corkhill and Chick Fulmer from the Reds in 1883, and as a consequence Sommer and Macullar were sent to Baltimore that offseason. There, they helped lead a turnaround for the Orioles in 1884, which secured the status of manager Billy Barnie. Cincinnati replaced Sommer that season by signing Browns outfielder Tom Mansell, with a $400 raise as an inducement.

In 1886, Sommer set the record for the lowest single-season batting average (.209) by a player with 500 or more at-bats. His record was broken in 1888 by Al Myers of the Washington Nationals, who hit .207 that year.

In the 1880s, the New York Clipper praised Sommer as one of the strongest defensive outfielders in baseball.

Sommer managed the Superior Red Sox of the Central International League in 1912.
