= Spike Shannon =

American baseball player (1875–1940)

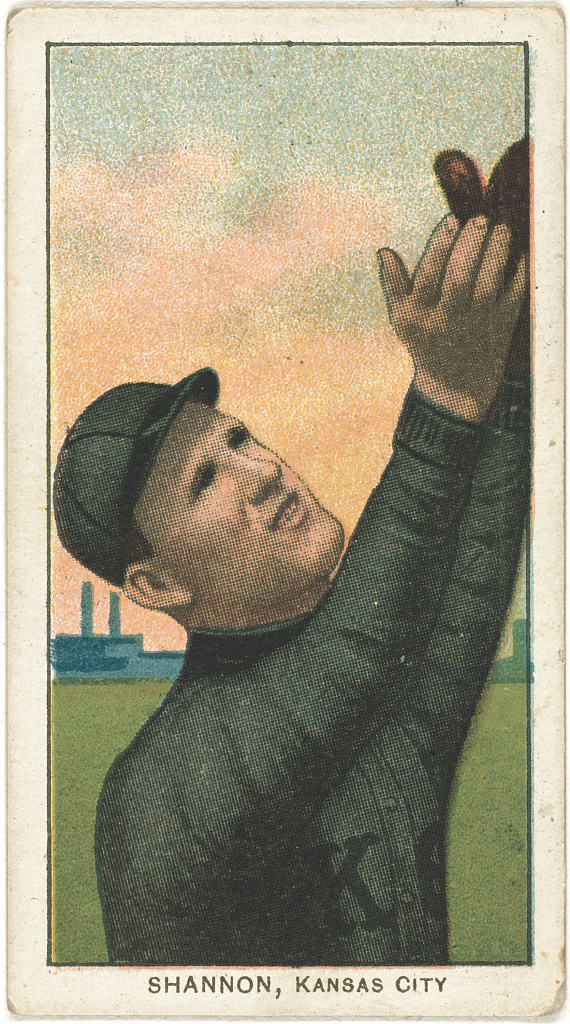
- Outfielder
- Born: February 7, 1875; Pittsburgh, Pennsylvania, U.S.
- Died: May 16, 1940 (aged 65); Minneapolis, Minnesota, U.S.
- Batted: Switch Threw: Right

MLB debut
- April 15, 1904, for the St. Louis Cardinals

Last MLB appearance
- September 30, 1908, for the Pittsburgh Pirates

MLB statistics
- Batting average: .259
- Stolen bases: 145
- Runs batted in: 183
- Stats at Baseball Reference

Teams
- St. Louis Cardinals (1904–1906); New York Giants (1906–1908); Pittsburgh Pirates (1908)

Career highlights and awards
- NL runs scored leader (1907)

William Porter "Spike" Shannon (February 7, 1875 – May 16, 1940) was an American professional baseball player and umpire.

Shannon was an outfielder over parts of five seasons (1904–1908) with the St. Louis Cardinals, New York Giants and Pittsburgh Pirates. He was the National League leader in runs scored in 1907, when he scored 104 runs for the Giants. For his career, he compiled a .259 batting average, 183 runs batted in, 383 runs scored, and 145 stolen bases. After his playing career, he was an umpire in the Federal League during 1914 and 1915 for a total of 177 games.

Shannon was an alumnus of Grove City College. He was born in Pittsburgh, and later died in Minneapolis at the age of 65.

== Minor and Major League career ==
Spike Shannon made his major league debut on April 15, 1904, at the age of 29. Before then he toiled in the minor leagues, playing for teams like the Richmond Bluebirds of the Atlantic League, The Syracuse Stars of the Eastern League, and the St. Paul Saints of the American Association. With St. Paul he played in 135 games and batted .308 along with 41 stolen bases.

In September 1903, the St. Louis Cardinals draft Shannon from St. Paul as part of that years Rule 5 draft. In his first season in the big leagues, he played in 134 games and stole 34 bases. He batted .280 in his rookie season. His batting average fell over the course of the next two seasons, though he remained a threat to steal on the base paths. On July 13, 1906, the Cardinals traded him to the Giants for catcher/outfielder Doc Marshall and OF/INF Sam Mertes. Despite having a .265 batting average in 1907, Shannon led the National League in runs scored with 104. He also led the league in at bats and plate appearances as well. 1908 would be his final season as a major league player. He struggled to start the season, and placed on waivers by the Giants. The Pittsburgh Pirates claimed him off waivers and paid the Giants $1,500 for his rights. However, he continued to slump and on September 30, 1908, he played his final game, going one for four against the St. Louis Cardinals, ironically, the very team he'd made his major league debut for a few seasons earlier.

In 694 games over five seasons, Shannon posted a .259 batting average (677-for-2613) with 383 runs, 3 home runs, 183 RBIs, 145 stolen bases and 286 bases on balls. He finished his career with a .974 fielding percentage playing at all three outfield positions.

Hoping to catch the eyes of scouts and make his way back to the big leagues, Shannon signed with the Kansas City Blues of the American Association. During a three-year stint his batting slump continued where in 1911, while appearing in 52 games, the best he could muster was a .216 batting average and he retired after the season. Shannon still made another comeback at the age of 38 a couple years later, this time for the Virginia Ore Diggers of the Northern League. Playing in 63 games, Shannon batted .236 and retired after the 1913 season.

After his playing days were over, Shannon returned to baseball again, this time as an umpire in the Federal League, a league that would go on to sue both the American and National Leagues, accusing them of having a monopoly on major league baseball. The Federal League was hoping to become a third major, but the lawsuit drained the league of revenue and it went out of business.

== Football ==
Shannon also played football, primarily as a halfback. After three seasons with the Grove City College football team from 1896 to 1898, he went on to play for the independent Verona (Pennsylvania) Indians in 1899 and for the professional Latrobe Athletic Association in 1900. Frequently injured in football, he later recalled in a 1932 interview, "I really liked football better than baseball despite the fact that I broke both legs, four ribs, and two fingers on the gridiron." Despite his fondness for football, he ultimately saw baseball as a more viable career path.

== Death ==
Spike Shannon died on May 17, 1940, at the age of 65.

== See also ==
- List of Major League Baseball annual runs scored leaders
