= Bane Park =

Park in Brainerd, Crow Wing County, Minnesota

Coordinates: 46.3388900°N 94.1975000°W

Bane Park is a park located in Brainerd, Minnesota, United States. It has a hockey rink, open rink, warming house, playground and baseball fields. From 1933 to 1935, it served as the home ballpark for three minor league baseball teams: the Brainerd Muskies (1933), the Brainerd-Little Falls Muskies (1934) and the Brainerd Blues (1935). They all played in the Northern League.

The baseball fields are currently used by Bronco and PONY league players.
