= Pink Hawley =

American baseball player (1872–1938)

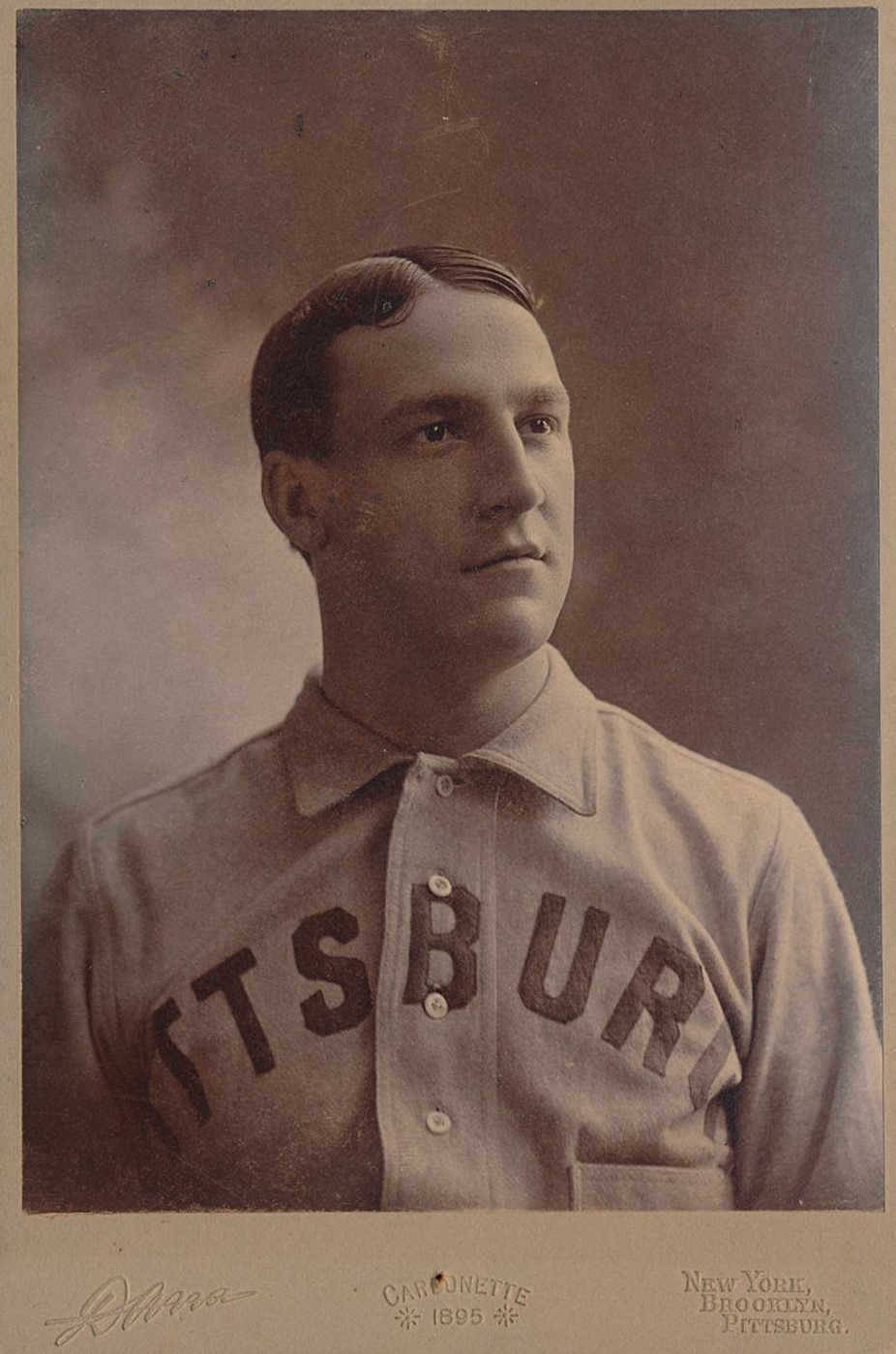
- Hawley in 1895
- Pitcher
- Born: December 5, 1872; Beaver Dam, Wisconsin, U.S.
- Died: September 19, 1938 (aged 65); Beaver Dam, Wisconsin, U.S.
- Batted: Left Threw: Right

MLB debut
- August 13, 1892, for the St. Louis Browns

Last MLB appearance
- August 20, 1901, for the Milwaukee Brewers

MLB statistics
- Win–loss record: 167–179
- Earned run average: 3.96
- Strikeouts: 868
- Stats at Baseball Reference

Teams
- St. Louis Browns (1892–1894); Pittsburgh Pirates (1895–1897); Cincinnati Reds (1898–1899); New York Giants (1900); Milwaukee Brewers (1901)

Emerson Pink Hawley (December 5, 1872 – September 19, 1938) was an American professional baseball pitcher. From 1892 to 1901, he played in the major leagues for the St. Louis Browns, Pittsburgh Pirates, Cincinnati Reds, New York Giants, and Milwaukee Brewers. Hawley had a win–loss record of 167–179 and holds the National League career record for hit batsmen.

== Early life ==
Emerson Hawley was born in Beaver Dam, Wisconsin, in 1872. He had a twin brother, Elmer. The nurse who assisted in their birth put a pink ribbon on Emerson and a blue ribbon on Elmer, leading to them being called Pink and Blue. Growing up in Beaver Dam, the twins played baseball together, with Pink as the pitcher and Blue as the catcher; they were known as the "Pink and Blue battery."

In 1891, Blue died of pneumonia. Pink then played for a semi-professional team in Fort Smith, Arkansas.

== Major league career ==
Hawley started his professional baseball career with the St. Louis Browns of the NL in August 1892. That season, he went 6–14 with a 3.19 earned run average (ERA) and 63 strikeouts.

In 1893, Hawley went 5–17 with a 4.60 ERA and 73 strikeouts.

In 1894, Hawley went 19–27 with a 4.90 ERA and 120 strikeouts. He led the NL with 27 losses, 10 games finished, and 21 hit batsmen.

In January 1895, the Browns traded Hawley to the Pittsburgh Pirates. Hawley had his best season in 1895, going 31–22 with a 3.18 ERA and 142 strikeouts. He led the NL with 56 games pitched, 444.1 innings pitched, 4 shutouts, and 33 hit batsmen.

In 1896, Hawley went 22–21 with a 3.57 ERA and 137 strikeouts.

In 1897, Hawley went 18–18 with a 4.80 ERA and 88 strikeouts. In November, the Pirates traded him to the Cincinnati Reds.

In 1898, Hawley went 27–11 with a 3.37 ERA and 69 strikeouts.

In 1899, Hawley went 14–17 with a 4.24 ERA and 46 strikeouts.

In March 1900, the Reds sold Hawley to the New York Giants. That season, Hawley went 18–18 with a 3.53 ERA and 80 strikeouts. He led the NL with 34 complete games.

Before the 1901 season, Hawley jumped to the Milwaukee Brewers of the American League. That season, Hawley went 7–14 with a 4.59 ERA and 50 strikeouts. The Brewers released him in September.

Hawley finished his MLB career with a record of 167–179, a 3.96 ERA, a 107 ERA+, and 868 strikeouts. His 210 career hit batsmen rank third in MLB history, and his 201 hit batsmen in the NL is a league record.

== Later life ==
Hawley played for several minor league teams in 1902. He then moved to La Crosse, Wisconsin, and opened a cigar store.

From 1905 to 1908, Hawley was a player-manager for the La Crosse Pinks. He led them to Wisconsin State League championships in 1905 and 1906.

Hawley eventually left professional baseball and returned to his hometown of Beaver Dam, where he ran a bowling alley. He died at his home in Beaver Dam in 1938.

== See also ==
- List of Major League Baseball annual shutout leaders
- List of Major League Baseball career hit batsmen leaders
- List of Major League Baseball career complete games leaders
