= Oscar Graham =

American baseball player (1878–1931)

- Pitcher
- Born: July 20, 1878; Plattsmouth, Nebraska, U.S.
- Died: October 15, 1931 (aged 53); Moline, Illinois, U.S.
- Batted: Left Threw: Left

MLB debut
- April 13, 1907, for the Washington Senators

Last MLB appearance
- August 5, 1907, for the Washington Senators

MLB statistics
- Win–loss record: 4-9
- Earned run average: 3.98
- Strikeouts: 44
- Stats at Baseball Reference

Teams
- Washington Senators (1907)

Oscar Marion Graham (July 20, 1878 – October 15, 1931) was an American professional baseball pitcher. In a 17-year career, he won four games in Major League Baseball and 272 games in the minor leagues. Graham was 6 feet tall and weighed 180 pounds.

== Professional career ==
Graham was born in Plattsmouth, Nebraska in 1878. He started his professional baseball career in 1901. In 1902, he won 16 games in the class A Western League. Graham then went to the Pacific Coast League's Oakland Oaks, and he put up some big numbers in the long PCL seasons. In 1903, he went 28–29 with a 3.44 earned run average, pitching 504.2 innings in 61 games. He led the league in games pitched, innings pitched, losses, and earned runs (193). His 234 walks and 49 hit batters during that season are PCL records that have never been broken. Graham was also a good hitter, as he had a batting average of .323 to finish sixth in the league in that category.

In 1904, Graham had a slightly lesser workload, as he pitched 392.1 innings and went 19–23 with a 2.89 ERA. Again, he hit well and finished ninth in the batting race at .305. Graham had one of his better seasons in 1905. He pitched over 500 innings for the second time and tied his career-high in wins with 28. His ERA dropped to 2.37, and he led the league with 56 games started. The following year, he tossed another 432 innings for Oakland and went 25–23. He was purchased by the American League's Washington Senators in August of that year.

Graham made his major league debut with the Senators on April 16, 1907. He ended up appearing in 20 games for them, including 14 starts, and he went 4–9 with a 3.98 ERA. His last MLB game was on August 5, and he then finished the season with the American Association's Minneapolis Millers.

Graham started 1908 with Minneapolis. He had a win–loss record of 8–5 before leaving to play for another team in the Virginia, Minnesota based Virginia Ore Diggers, where he was paid a "whopping" $350 each month. Graham returned to the American Association in 1909, this time with the Indianapolis Indians. In 40 games, he went 15-15. He started off 1910 with them, as well, but was released in July for "failure to keep in winning condition."

For the next few years, Graham bounced around the minor leagues. He had his fifth, and final, 20-win season in 1916, when he went 23–12 with a 2.31 ERA in the Illinois–Indiana–Iowa League. He tied for the league-lead in victories.

== After retirement ==
Graham retired from professional baseball after the 1917 season. He pitched a total of 17 years and won 276 games – 272 in the minor leagues and 4 in the major leagues.

Graham lived in Rising Sun, Iowa, in the winters, and he worked as a corn husker and rabbit hunter during that time. He died in Moline, Illinois, in 1931.

== Death ==
Graham died on October 15, 1931, in Moline, Illinois. He is interred at Riverside Cemetery in Moline.
