= Rochester Bears =

The Rochester Bears were a minor league baseball team that played in the Minnesota–Wisconsin League in 1911. The team was based in Rochester, Minnesota and became the Rochester Bugs for 1912.
