= Rochester Bugs =

The Rochester Bugs were a minor league baseball team based in Rochester, Minnesota. The team, managed by Art Lizzette, played in the Minnesota–Wisconsin League in 1912. It was the last professional team to come from the city until the 1958 Rochester A's.
