= Dave Callahan =

American baseball player (1888–1969)

- Outfielder
- Born: July 20, 1888; Seneca, Illinois, U.S.
- Died: October 28, 1969 (aged 81); Ottawa, Illinois, U.S.
- Batted: Left Threw: Right

MLB debut
- September 14, 1910, for the Cleveland Naps

Last MLB appearance
- October 4, 1911, for the Cleveland Naps

MLB statistics
- Batting average: .200
- Home runs: 0
- Runs batted in: 2
- Stats at Baseball Reference

Teams
- Cleveland Naps (1910–1911)

David Joseph Callahan (July 20, 1888 – October 28, 1969) was an American Major League Baseball outfielder who played for two seasons. He played for the Cleveland Naps from 1910 to 1911.

== Career ==
Callahan made his debut for the Naps around the same time as a young Shoeless Joe Jackson. Cleveland's manager, Jimmy McAleer, seemed more hopeful about Callahan's prospects, saying that Callahan was the best outfielder to arrive in Cleveland in a decade. Callahan spent two years with the team, but he played in only 19 games before leaving the major leagues in 1911.
