= Burleigh Grimes =

American baseball player and manager (1893–1985)

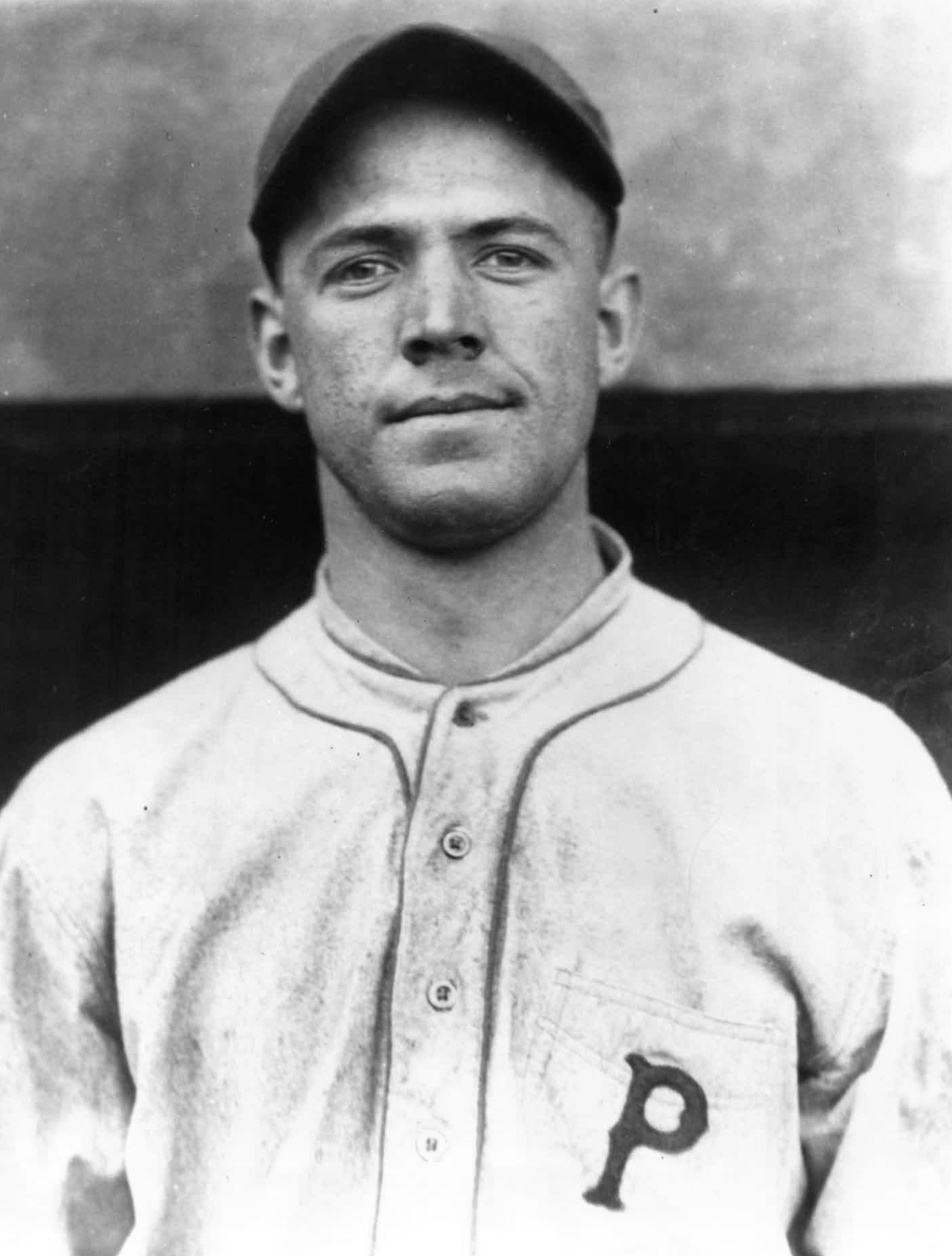
- Grimes, c. 1916
- Pitcher / Manager
- Born: August 18, 1893; Emerald, Wisconsin, U.S.
- Died: December 6, 1985 (aged 92); Clear Lake, Wisconsin, U.S.
- Batted: Right Threw: Right

MLB debut
- September 10, 1916, for the Pittsburgh Pirates

Last MLB appearance
- September 20, 1934, for the Pittsburgh Pirates

MLB statistics
- Win–loss record: 270–212
- Earned run average: 3.53
- Strikeouts: 1,512
- Managerial record: 131–171
- Winning %: .434
- Stats at Baseball Reference
- Managerial record at Baseball Reference

Teams
- As player: Pittsburgh Pirates (1916–1917); Brooklyn Robins (1918–1926); New York Giants (1927); Pittsburgh Pirates (1928–1929); Boston Braves (1930); St. Louis Cardinals (1930–1931); Chicago Cubs (1932–1933); St. Louis Cardinals (1933–1934); New York Yankees (1934); Pittsburgh Pirates (1934); As manager: Brooklyn Dodgers (1937–1938)

Career highlights and awards
- World Series champion (1931); 2× NL wins leader (1921, 1928); NL strikeout leader (1921)

Member of the National

Baseball Hall of Fame
- Induction: 1964
- Election method: Veterans Committee

Burleigh Arland Grimes (August 18, 1893 – December 6, 1985) was an American professional baseball player and manager, and the last major league pitcher who was officially permitted to throw the spitball. Grimes made the most of this advantage, as well as his unshaven, menacing presence on the mound, which earned him the nickname "Ol' Stubblebeard." In his career, Grimes won 270 games, with 190 of them occurring in the 1920s, the most for all pitchers in the decade. He pitched in the World Series four times in his nineteen-season career and was elected to the Baseball Hall of Fame in 1964. A decade earlier, he had been inducted into the Wisconsin Athletic Hall of Fame.

== Early life ==
Born in Emerald, Wisconsin, Grimes was the first child of Cecil "Nick" Grimes, a farmer and former day laborer, and Ruth Tuttle, the daughter of a former Wisconsin legislator. Nick Grimes, having previously played baseball for several local teams, managed the Clear Lake Yellow Jackets and taught his son how to play the game early in life. Burleigh Grimes also participated in boxing as a child.

Grimes threw and batted right-handed, and was listed as 5 feet 10 inches (1.78 m) tall and 175 pounds (79 kg). He made his professional debut in 1912 for the Eau Claire Commissioners of the Minnesota–Wisconsin League. From almost the beginning of his career, he threw a spitball, using slippery elm to alter the baseball's face. He played in Ottumwa, Iowa, in 1913 for the Ottumwa Packers in the Central Association.

== MLB career ==
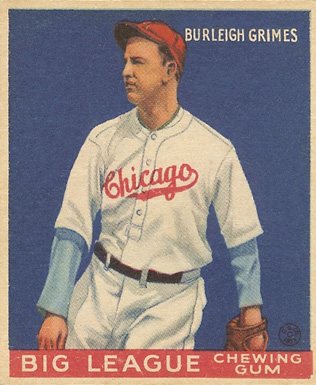
Baseball card of Grimes

Grimes played for the Pittsburgh Pirates in 1916 and 1917. In 1917, he lost 13 straight decisions. Before the 1918 season, he was sent to the Brooklyn Dodgers in a multiplayer trade. When the spitball was banned in 1920, he was named as one of 17 established pitchers who were allowed to continue to throw the pitch. According to Baseball Digest, the Phillies were able to hit him because they knew when he was throwing the spitter.

He then pitched for the New York Giants (1927), the Pirates again (1928–1929), the Boston Braves (1930) and the St. Louis Cardinals (1930-1931). With the Pirates in 1928, he posted a 25–14 record, posting the most wins, complete games, shutouts, and innings pitched of any NL pitcher. In the 1931 World Series, despite suffering a dislocated vertebra before Game 7, Grimes pitched 8 1/3 innings, earning the final win in the Cardinals' series victory. He was traded to the Chicago Cubs before the 1932 season in exchange for Hack Wilson and Bud Teachout. He returned to the Cardinals in 1933 and 1934, then moved to the Pirates (1934) and the New York Yankees (1934). Grimes was nicknamed "Ol' Stubblebeard", related to his habit of not shaving on days in which he was going to pitch.

Grimes was a very good hitting pitcher in his major league career, posting a .248 batting average (380-for-1535) with 157 runs, 62 doubles, 11 triples, 2 home runs and 168 RBI. He also drew 69 bases on balls. He had nine seasons with 10 or more RBIs, with a high of 16 in 1920 and 1928. In four World Series appearances (1920, 1930–1932) he hit .316 (6-for-19) with 1 run and 2 RBI.

At the time of his retirement, he was the last player who was legally allowed to throw a spitball, as he was one of 17 spitballers permitted to throw the pitch after it was otherwise outlawed in 1920. Baseball historian Frank Russo called him "baseball's most aggressive spitballer". Grimes had acquired a lasting field reputation for his temperament. He was known for wanting to win in any way possible. Prior to a game against the Giants late in 1924, Grimes organized a team meeting and said, "Anyone who doesn't want to play today's game to win, let me know right now." Then, on his first pitch, he knocked down a Giant. He is listed in the Baseball Hall of Shame series for having thrown a ball at the batter in the on-deck circle. The only two batters Grimes apparently could not intimidate were Hall of Famers Frankie Frisch and Paul Waner. If Grimes threw a close pitch to them, the batters usually followed it up with a hard-hit line drive. Grimes's friends and supporters note that he was consistently a kind man when off the diamond. Others claim he showed a greedy attitude to many people who 'got on his bad side.' He would speak mainly only to his best friend Ivy Olson in the dugout, and would pitch only to a man named Mathias Schroeder before games. Schroeder's identity was not well known among many Dodger players, as many say he was just 'a nice guy from the neighborhood.' Dodger manager Wilbert Robinson did not get along well with Grimes, using a clubhouse attendant to tell Grimes when he pitched so that he could talk to Grimes as little as possible.

Grimes had a total of 36 Major League teammates who would later be elected to the Hall of Fame. No other Hall of Famer had more Hall of Fame teammates.

== Post-playing career ==
Grimes moved to the minor leagues in 1935 as a player-manager for the Bloomington Bloomers of the Illinois–Indiana–Iowa League. He started 21 games for the team, recording a 2.34 ERA and a 10–5 record. He did not pitch again after that season, moving on to manage the Louisville Colonels of the American Association.

Grimes was the manager of the Dodgers in 1937–1938. He followed Casey Stengel's term as Dodgers manager. He compiled a two-year record of 131–171 (.434), with his teams finishing sixth and seventh respectively in the National League. Babe Ruth was one of Grimes's coaches. Leo Durocher was the team's shortstop in 1937 and a coach in 1938. When Grimes was fired by general manager Larry MacPhail after the 1938 season, Durocher was hired to replace him. MacPhail said the team's morale had not been right for a long period of time.

Grimes remained in baseball for many years as a minor league manager and a scout. He scouted for the Yankees, Athletics, and Orioles.

He managed the Toronto Maple Leafs of the International League from 1942 to 1944, and again in 1952 and 1953, winning the pennant in 1943.

As a scout with the Baltimore Orioles, Grimes discovered Jim Palmer and Dave McNally.

Grimes also assisted in managing the Independence Yankees in Independence, Kansas in 1948 and 1949, where Mickey Mantle started his professional career in 1949.

== Later life ==
Grimes was elected to the Baseball Hall of Fame in 1964.

Grimes died following a protracted battle with cancer at age 92 on December 6, 1985, in Clear Lake, Wisconsin. His wife Lillian survived him. He is buried in the Clear Lake Cemetery.

== See also ==
- List of Major League Baseball career wins leaders
- List of Major League Baseball annual strikeout leaders
- List of Major League Baseball annual wins leaders
- List of members of the Baseball Hall of Fame
- List of Major League Baseball career hit batsmen leaders
