= Duluth White Sox =

- 1903–1934; (1903 – 1916, 1934); Duluth, Minnesota

Minor league affiliations
- Previous classes: D (1903–1905, 1907–1910, 1934); C (1906, 1911–1916)
- League: Northern League (1903–1905, 1908, 1913–1916, 1934)
- Previous leagues: Central International League (1912); Minnesota–Wisconsin League (1909–1911); Northern-Copper Country League (1906–1907)

Minor league titles
- League titles: 1904, 1905, 1909, 1912, 1914

Team data
- Previous names: Duluth Cardinals (1903)
- Previous parks: Athletic Park (1903–1916, 1934)

The Duluth White Sox were a minor league baseball team based in Duluth, Minnesota, that played from 1903 to 1916, and in 1934. The team played in the Northern League (1903–1905, 1908, 1913–1916, 1934), Northern-Copper Country League (1906–1907), Minnesota–Wisconsin League (1909–1911) and Central International League (1912). The team was known as the "Cardinals" in 1903. When professional baseball returned to Duluth in 1934 after 18 years, the name White Sox was used for one season before the team became the Duluth Dukes. The team played its home games at Athletic Park.

== League championships ==
- Northern League -- 1904, 1905, 1914
- Minnesota–Wisconsin League -- 1909
- Central International League -- 1912

== Major League players ==
- 1903 -- Hank Gehring, Lee Quillin
- 1904 -- Art Ball, Hank Gehring, Joe Koukalik, Frank Martin, Lee Quillin, Newt Randall
- 1905 -- Cy Neighbors
- 1906 -- Frank Moore
- 1907 -- None
- 1908 -- Jack Ness, Larry Pratt
- 1909 -- Dave Bancroft, Hooks Dauss, Don Marion, Otto Miller
- 1910 -- George Anderson, Hooks Dauss, Don Marion
- 1911 -- Elmer Miller, Gene Woodburn
- 1912 -- Red Bluhm, Elmer Miller
- 1913 -- Elmer Miller, Hank Schreiber, Elmer Smith
- 1914 -- George Cunningham, Harry Wolfe
- 1915 -- Harry Wolfe
- 1916 -- Rube Ehrhardt, Mike Menosky, Hank Schreiber, Bill Webb, Frank Withrow, Harry Wolfe
- 1934 -- None

== National Baseball Hall of Fame players ==
- Dave Bancroft -- played for the White Sox briefly in 1909 before moving on to the Superior Drillers, also in the Minnesota–Wisconsin League.

== Other notable players ==
- Frank Lausche -- Ohio politician played for the White Sox in 1916. He was a Mayor of Cleveland, Governor of Ohio, and United States Senator.
