= Leo Posada =

Cuban baseball player (1934–2022)

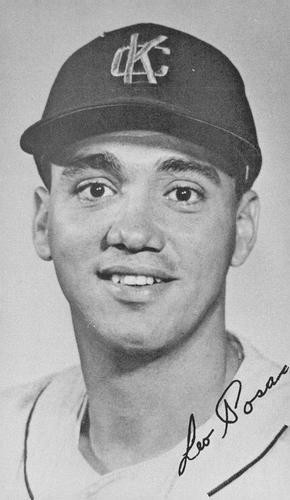
- Posada in 1961
- Outfielder
- Born: April 1, 1934; Havana, Cuba
- Died: June 23, 2022 (aged 88); Miami, Florida, U.S.
- Batted: Right Threw: Right

MLB debut
- September 21, 1960, for the Kansas City Athletics

Last MLB appearance
- July 20, 1962, for the Kansas City Athletics

MLB statistics
- Batting average: .256
- Home runs: 8
- Runs batted in: 58
- Stats at Baseball Reference

Teams
- Kansas City Athletics (1960–1962)

Leopoldo Jesús Posada Hernández (April 1, 1934 – June 23, 2022) was a Cuban professional baseball player. He played for the Kansas City Athletics of Major League Baseball from 1960 through 1962. After his retirement as a player, Posada served as a manager in Minor League Baseball.

== Early life ==
Posada was born on April 1, 1934, in Havana, Cuba. He was not, as is commonly believed, Jorge Posada's uncle. They were at most distant kin (Leo had just one sister; Jorge Posada Sr. was not his brother).

He attended high school in Havana, and played baseball and volleyball. Posada was a cyclist before beginning his professional baseball career. He was a national champion and represented Cuba in cycling at the 1951 Pan American Games and the 1954 Central American and Caribbean Games.

== Career ==
=== Playing career (1954–1967) ===
Posada was signed as an amateur free agent by the Milwaukee Braves of Major League Baseball (MLB) in 1954. He began the 1954 season with the Odessa Oilers of the Class C Longhorn League and also played for the Lake Charles Lakers of the Class C Evangeline League. Posada played for the Corpus Christi Clippers of the Class B Big State League in 1955 and 1956. After the 1956 season, the Columbia Gems of the Class A South Atlantic League selected Posada from Corpus Christi in the minor league phase of the Rule 5 draft. Posada started the season with Columbia and promoted to the Little Rock Travelers of the Class AA Southern Association, and then sent down to the Abilene Blue Sox of the Big State League during the season. He played for the Rochester A's of the Class B Illinois–Indiana–Iowa League in 1958 and the Shreveport Sports of the Southern Association in 1959. Posada attended spring training with the Kansas City Athletics of MLB before the 1960 season, but was sent back to Shreveport for the start of the season. He batted .314 with 18 home runs and 122 runs batted in (RBIs) for Shreveport in 1960.

Posada made his MLB debut with the Athletics on September 21, 1960. He played in 10 games for Kansas City in 1960, recording a .361 batting average. In 1961, Athletics manager Joe Gordon chose to start Posada over Hank Bauer in the Opening Day starting lineup. Posada struggled to begin the season, batting .190, before he was optioned to Shreveport; Athletics general manager Frank Lane had intended to option Norm Bass to the minor leagues, but team owner Charlie O. Finley overruled Lane, who sent down Posada instead. In 116 games for Kansas City in the 1961 season, Posada batted .253. He was returned to Shreveport for the 1962 season, but also played in 29 games for the Athletics, batting .196. He played in his final MLB game on July 20, 1962. In MLB, Posada had a .256 batting average, eight home runs, and 58 RBIs in 426 plate appearances, all for Kansas City.

On August 3, 1962, the Athletics traded Posada, Dale Willis, and Bill Kunkel along with cash considerations to the Toronto Maple Leafs of the Class AAA International League for Orlando Peña. Posada began the 1963 season with Toronto, but batted .235 for the Maple Leafs before he was optioned to the Hawaii Islanders of the Pacific Coast League (PCL) in May. Posada played in 12 games for Hawaii, recording two hits in 14 at bats (.143), before the Islanders reassigned Posada to the Seattle Rainiers of the PCL. He was released by Seattle and finished the 1963 season with the Sultanes de Monterrey of the Class AA Mexican League. He batted .267 for Monterrey. Before the 1964 season, Posada signed with the Houston Colt .45s (now the Houston Astros) of MLB, who assigned him to the San Antonio Bullets of the Class AA Texas League. Posada batted .272 with 22 home runs for San Antonio. Playing for the Amarillo Sonics of the Texas League in 1965, Posada was named to the league's all-star game and he won the Texas League Player of the Year Award. Posada led the league with 26 home runs, 107 RBIs, and 266 total bases. He returned to Amarillo in 1966 and batted .317. Posada served as a player-coach for the Oklahoma City 89ers of the PCL in 1967.

=== Managing career (1968–1980s) ===
In 1968, the Astros announced that Tony Pacheco would manage the Cocoa Astros of the Class A Florida State League (FSL) from April until June, at which point Pacheco would become the manager of the Covington Astros, in the short-season Gulf Coast League, and Posada would take over as Cocoa's manager. Posada was a player-manager for Cocoa. He batted .284 in 148 at bats for Cocoa in 1968 and returned to manage Cocoa in 1969. He played in nine games for Cocoa in the 1969 season, the final season in which he appeared as a player. He then served as a scout for the Astros. Posada became the manager of the Cedar Rapids Astros of the Midwest League for the 1973 season.

After the 1974 season, executives Tal Smith and Pat Gillick left the Astros for the New York Yankees organization. In 1975, Posada served as manager of the Fort Lauderdale Yankees of the FSL. He returned to the Astros organization as the manager of the Columbus Astros in 1976 and 1977 and the Daytona Beach Astros in 1978. In 1979, he joined the Los Angeles Dodgers organization as their minor league hitting instructor. Posada continued to work as a hitting coach for the Dodgers organization, and he provided instruction to Raúl Mondesí. He also served as a manager for the Águilas del Zulia and Cardenales de Lara of the Venezuelan Professional Baseball League and for the Tigres del Licey of the Dominican Professional Baseball League.

== Personal life ==
Posada's father, mother, and sister left Cuba for the United States after the Cuban Revolution.

Posada settled in Miami, Florida, and he owned a bicycle store. Posada died on June 23, 2022, in Miami, from pancreatic cancer.

== See also ==
- List of Major League Baseball players from Cuba
