= Wausau Lumberjacks =

- 1905–1957; (1905-1914, 1936-1942, 1946-1953, 1956-1957); Wausau, Wisconsin

Minor league affiliations
- Previous classes: Class C (1956-1957); Class D (1946-1953); Class C (1941-1942); Class D (1936-1940); Class C (1911-1914); Class D (1905-1910)
- Previous leagues: Northern League (1956-1957); Wisconsin State League (1946-1953); Northern League (1936-1942); Wisconsin-Illinois League (1912-1914); Minnesota-Wisconsin League (1909-1911); Wisconsin-Illinois League (1908); Wisconsin State League (1905-1907)

Major league affiliations
- Previous teams: Cincinnati Reds (1956-1957); Detroit Tigers (1951-1953); St. Louis Browns (1947-1949); Cleveland Indians (1942); Philadelphia Phillies (1940-1941); Cleveland Indians (1936-1937)

Team data
- Previous names: Wausau Lumberjacks (1956-1957); Wausau Timberjacks (1950-1953); Wausau Lumberjacks (1946-1949); Wausau Timberjacks (1936-1942); Wausau Lumberjacks (1905-1914)
- Previous parks: Athletic Park

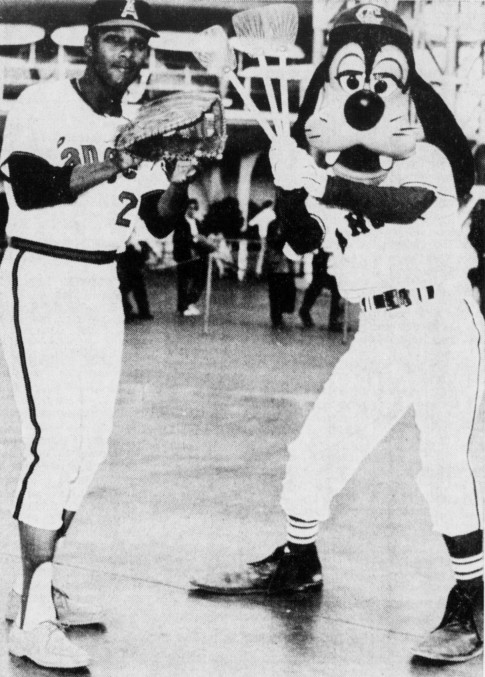
Vada Pinson, 1972

The Wausau Lumberjacks (occasionally known as the Timberjacks) were a minor league baseball team based in Wausau, Wisconsin that existed on-and-off from 1905 to 1957. The Wausau franchise then became the Wausau Timbers before relocating to become today's Kane County Cougars. The Lumberjacks played in the Wisconsin State League (1905–1907, 1946–1949), Wisconsin–Illinois League (1908, 1912–1914), Minnesota–Wisconsin League (1909–1911) and Northern League (1936–1939, 1956–1957).

The team was affiliated with the Cleveland Indians (1936–1937), Milwaukee Brewers (1938), St. Louis Browns (1947–1949) and Cincinnati Redlegs (1956–1957). The team played its home games at Athletic Park from 1936 to 1957.

== The Ballpark ==
The Lumberjacks played at Athletic Park, located at 324 E. Wausau Ave. Wausau, Wisconsin

Originally built in 1936, Athletic Park was also home to the Timbers of the Class-A Midwest League (1975-1990) and the Wausau Timberjacks (1950–1953). The park hosted the Lumberjacks in three separate incarnations (1936-1942, 1946–1949, 1956–57).

Currently, since 1994, Athletic Field has hosted the Wisconsin Woodchucks of the summer collegiate Northwoods League}.

== Notable players ==
Ray Boone played for the Lumberjacks in 1942. Boone enjoyed a 13-year big league career (1943–1960). Ray was the patriarch of the Boone family, followed by son, Bob Boone and grandsons Brett Boone and Aaron Boone. The Boone family was the first to send three generations to the All-Star Game. Ray led the AL in RBIs in 1955. He was a 2x All-Star and World Series Champion with the Detroit Tigers. Boone had career stats of: .275, 151 HR, 737 RBI.

Vada Pinson played for the Lumberjacks in 1956. Pinson enjoyed an 18-year big league career (1958–1975). Pinson combined power, speed and was Gold Glove Award winning center fielder. His best years were with the Cincinnati Reds (1958–1968). Vada twice led the National League in hits (1961, 1963). He batted .343 in 1961, when the Reds won the pennant. He was a National League All-Star 4x. Pinson had career stats of: .286, 256 HR, 1,170 RBI. He had 2,757 hits in his stellar career.

== Notable alumni ==
- Phil Masi (1937) 3 x MLB All-Star;
- Dickie Kerr (1927) MLB: 20 game winner
- Wally Gilbert (1939–40, 1941–42)
- Ray Boone (1942) 2 x MLB All-Star; 1955 NL RBI Leader
- Fred Schulte (1946, MGR)
- Ryne Duren (1949) 3 x MLB All-Star; 1958 AL Saves Leader
- Mike Tresh (1952) MLB All-Star
- Bob Bruce (1953)
- Vada Pinson (1956) 2 x MLB All-Star; 2,757 MLB hits
- Jack Baldschun (1957)
- Dave Bristol (1957) MLB Manager
- Cookie Rojas (1957) 5 x MLB-All Star
