= Mayo Field (Rochester, Minnesota) =

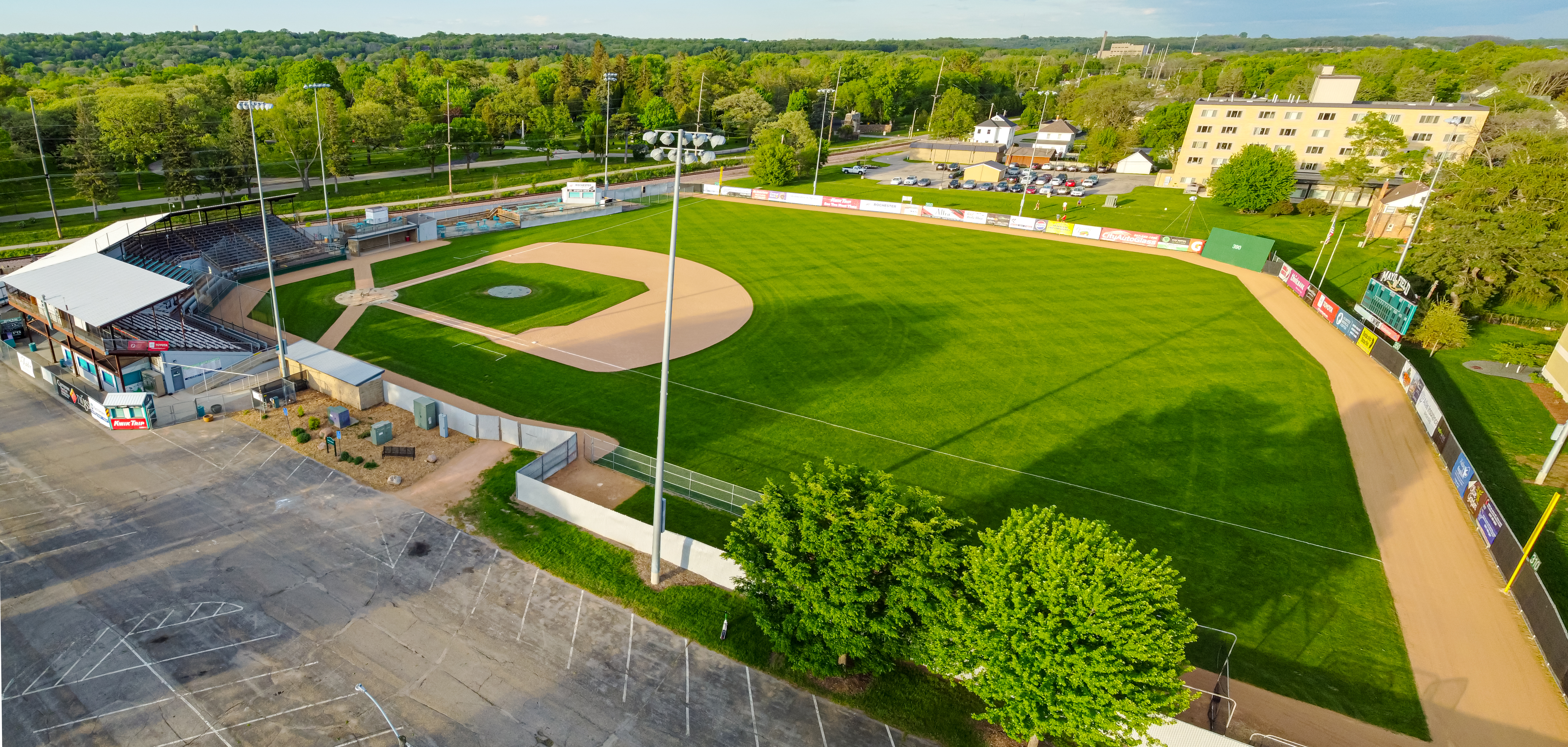

- Location within Minnesota Location within the United States
- Interactive map of Mayo Field
- Address: 403 East Center Street; Rochester, MN 55904
- Coordinates: 44°01′30″N 92°27′24″W
- Owner: City of Rochester
- Capacity: 3,570
- Surface: Natural Grass
- Record attendance: 3,109
- Field size: Left field: 310 ft (94 m); Center field: 390 ft (120 m); Right field: 310 ft (94 m)
- Public transit: RPT

Construction
- Opened: 1951

Tenants
- Rochester A's (3IL) 1958; Rochester Aces (NL) 1993; Rochester Honkers (NWL) 1994–2026

Website
- Mayo Field – Rochester Sports

Mayo Field is a stadium in Rochester, Minnesota. The ballpark is primarily used for baseball and was the home field of the Rochester Honkers baseball team, part of the Northwoods League. The stadium is able to hold 3,570 people. The Honkers went on hiatus after the 2026 season saying that increasing structural maintenance costs due to aging and deterioration of the stadium made it impractical to continue there.
