= Brainerd–Little Falls Muskies =

The Brainerd–Little Falls Muskies (also known as the Brandon Grays or Brainerd Blues) were a minor league baseball team that played for three seasons under different names from 1933 to 1935 in the Northern League. They represented the cities of Brainerd, Minnesota and Little Falls, Minnesota (and briefly Brandon, Manitoba in 1933). They played their home games at Bane Park in Brainerd.

They were briefly the Brandon Grays in their 1933 season after a 14-21 start in Brainerd, moving on June 27th. Finishing the season at an overall record of 55-46 under manager Ed Reichle, good for third in the Northern league. They lost in the league finals that year.

Under manager Charlie Patton in 1934 they went 58-58, good for fourth in the league.

In 1935 under Charlie Patton's second year, the Brainerd-Little Falls Muskies became the Brainerd Blues and went 45-67 finishing 8th in the league.
