= Winona Pirates =

US minor league baseball team

The Winona Pirates were a Minnesota–Wisconsin League (1909–1912) and Northern League (1913–1914) minor league baseball team based in Winona, Minnesota. They were the first professional team to play in Winona since 1884 and the last until the Winona A's briefly returned in 1958. Hooks Dauss, who won over 200 games at the major league level, played for the Pirates in 1911.
