= Central International League =

US-Canada baseball league (1912–1912)

- Classification: Class C (1912)
- Sport: Minor League Baseball
- First season: 1912
- Folded: 1912
- Replaced by: Northern League
- President: Henry A. Blume (1912)
- No. of teams: 8
- Country: United States of America; Canada
- Most titles: 1 Duluth White Sox (1912)

The Central International League was a four–team minor baseball league that played in 1912. A Class C level league, the Central International League played only the 1912 season, with the Duluth White Sox winning the league championship. In 1913, the league expanded and was renamed to become the Northern League.

== History ==
It featured four teams: the Duluth White Sox, Superior Red Sox, Grand Forks Flickertails and Winnipeg Maroons. Duluth won the league's championship in 1912, with a record of 58–41. Superior (51–54) placed second, ten games behind. Grand Forks (50–55) was third and Winnipeg (50–59) was last. In 1913, the league expanded to include clubs in Minneapolis, St. Paul, Virginia, and Winona, Minnesota, and its name changed to the Northern League.

10–year major league veteran Joe Sommer managed Superior and Otto Krueger, who spent seven years in the majors, managed Winnipeg. Tracy Baker, who played for the Boston Red Sox in 1911, played in the league.

== Cities represented ==
- Duluth, MN: Duluth White Sox 1912
- Grand Forks, ND: Grand Forks Flickertails 1912
- Superior, WI: Superior Red Sox 1912
- Winnipeg, MB: Winnipeg Maroons 1912

== Standings & statistics ==
=== 1912 Central International League ===
schedule

Team standings	W	L	PCT	GB	Managers
Duluth White Sox	58	41	.586	–	Thomas J. "Darby" O'Brien
Superior Red Sox	51	54	.486	10.0	John "Kid" Taylor / Joe Sommer
Grand Forks Flickertails	50	55	.476	11.0	Frank Lohr / Harmony Van Dine
Winnipeg Maroons	50	59	.459	13.0	Jim Brown / Otto Krueger

No playoffs scheduled. No individual stats available.
