= Superior Drillers =

- 1909; Superior, Wisconsin

Minor league affiliations
- Class: Class D (1909)
- League: Minnesota-Wisconsin League (1909)

Minor league titles
- League titles: none

Team data
- Name: Superior Drillers (1909)
- Manager: Lew Drill

The Superior Drillers were a Minnesota–Wisconsin League minor league baseball team based in Superior, Wisconsin that played in 1909. It was managed by Lew Drill. Drill, Phil Stremmel and, most notably, Hall of Fame shortstop Dave Bancroft played for the team.
