= Rochester Roosters =

American minor league baseball team (1910)

The Rochester Roosters were a Minnesota–Wisconsin League minor league baseball team that played during the 1910 season. They were the first professional team to be based in Rochester, Minnesota. They were managed by Frank O'Leary and were led by William Dunn offensively and Bernard McNeil on the mound.
