= Dan Pfister =

American baseball player (1936–2020)

- Pitcher
- Born: December 20, 1936; Plainfield, New Jersey, U.S.
- Died: November 9, 2020 (aged 83); Davie, Florida, U.S.
- Batted: Right Threw: Right

MLB debut
- September 9, 1961, for the Kansas City Athletics

Last MLB appearance
- July 31, 1964, for the Kansas City Athletics

MLB statistics
- Win–loss record: 6–19
- Earned run average: 4.87
- Strikeouts: 156
- Stats at Baseball Reference

Teams
- Kansas City Athletics (1961–1964)

Daniel Albin Pfister (December 20, 1936 – November 9, 2020) was an American right-handed professional baseball pitcher in the Major Leagues from 1961 to 1964. He played for the Kansas City Athletics and spent his entire eight-season professional career (1957–1958; 1960–1965) in the Athletics organization. He stood 6 feet (1.83 m) tall and weighed 187 pounds (85 kg) during his pro career.

Pfister allowed 238 hits and 142 bases on balls in 249 1/3 innings pitched over 65 Major League games. He struck out 156 batters.

After retirement from professional baseball, Pfister became a firefighter in Hollywood, Florida.

Pfister died on November 9, 2020, at the age of 83.
