= Hal Raether =

American baseball player (1932–2020)

- Pitcher
- Born: October 10, 1932; Lake Mills, Wisconsin, U.S.
- Died: September 26, 2020 (aged 87); Spring Park, Minnesota, U.S.
- Batted: Right Threw: Right

MLB debut
- July 4, 1954, for the Philadelphia Athletics

Last MLB appearance
- May 19, 1957, for the Kansas City Athletics

MLB statistics
- Win–loss record: 0–0
- Earned run average: 6.75
- Innings pitched: 4
- Stats at Baseball Reference

Teams
- Philadelphia / Kansas City Athletics (1954, 1957)

Harold Herman Raether (October 10, 1932 – September 26, 2020), nicknamed "Bud", was an American Major League Baseball relief pitcher. He appeared in only two games in MLB, one for the 1954 Philadelphia Athletics, and one for the 1957 Kansas City Athletics three years later, after the franchise moved to Kansas City, Missouri. Raether threw and batted right-handed, stood 6 feet 1 inch (1.85 m) tall and weighed 185 pounds (84 kg).

Raether played at the collegiate level at the University of Wisconsin-Madison. His pro career began in 1954 and lasted for four seasons (1954–55 and 1957–58). In the majors, he allowed three earned runs and three hits in four full innings pitched; he issued four bases on balls and did not record a strikeout. One of the hits he surrendered was a home run, hit by eventual Baseball Hall of Famer George Kell on May 19, 1957.

Raether died on September 26, 2020, at the age of 87.
