= Winnipeg Maroons =

- 1902–1942; (1902–1917, 1919–1921, 1933–1942); Winnipeg, Manitoba

Minor league affiliations
- Previous classes: Class D (1933–1942); Class B (1920–1921); Class C (1912–1916, 1919); Class D (1907–1911, 1917); Class C (1906); Class D (1903–1905); Independent (1902)
- League: Northern League (1933–1942)
- Previous leagues: Western Canada League (1919–1921); Northern League (1913–1917); Central International League (1912); Western Canada League (1909–1911); Northern League (1908); Northern-Copper Country League (1906–1907); Northern League (1903–1905); Independent (1902)

Major league affiliations
- Previous teams: Pittsburgh Pirates (1936)

Minor league titles
- League titles: 8 (1902, 1903, 1907, 1912, 1916, 1935, 1939, 1942)

Team data
- Previous parks: Sherburn Park (1923–1942); Happyland Park (1906–1922)

The Winnipeg Maroons were a minor League baseball team based in Winnipeg, Manitoba, Canada, which played in the Northern League from 1902 to 1942. Their home field from 1906 to 1922 was Happyland Park, which had a seating capacity of 4,000. They subsequently played at Sherburn Park, which had a seating capacity of 3,500. One of the most successful teams in the league, they won league championships eight times (1902, 1903, 1907, 1912, 1916, 1935, 1939, 1942).

In 1933 they re-entered the Northern League, the lowest classification of professional minor league ball (D class).

== List of Northern League Championship Wins ==
- 1902 Winnipeg Maroons
- 1903 Winnipeg Maroons
- 1907 Winnipeg Maroons
- 1916 Winnipeg Maroons
- 1935 Winnipeg Maroons
- 1939 Winnipeg Maroons
- 1942 Winnipeg Maroons
