= Superior Red Sox =

Minor league baseball team from 1903 to 1916

- 1903–1916; (1903-1905, 1909-1916); Superior, Wisconsin

Minor league affiliations
- Previous classes: Class C (1911-1916); Class D (1903-1905, 1909-1910)
- Previous leagues: Northern League (1913-1916); Central International League (1912); Minnesota-Wisconsin League (1909-1911); Northern League (1903-1905)

Team data
- Previous names: Superior Red Sox (1910-1916); Superior Drillers (1909); St. Cloud-Brainerd Longshoremen (1905); Superior Longshoremen (1903-1905)

The Superior Red Sox were a Minnesota–Wisconsin League (1910–1911), Central International League (1912) and Northern League (1913–1916) minor league baseball team based in Superior, Wisconsin. The Red Sox won the Minnesota–Wisconsin League pennant in 1911, under manager John "Kid" Taylor. Future Hall of Fame shortstop Dave Bancroft played for the team from 1910 to 1911.

The Superior Red Sox were part of a broader boom in minor league baseball during the early 20th century. Teams like Superior helped develop local talent and provided entertainment in smaller cities. The SABR Minor Leagues Research Committee has documented these teams extensively, noting the challenges in preserving accurate statistics due to inconsistent record-keeping and league instability

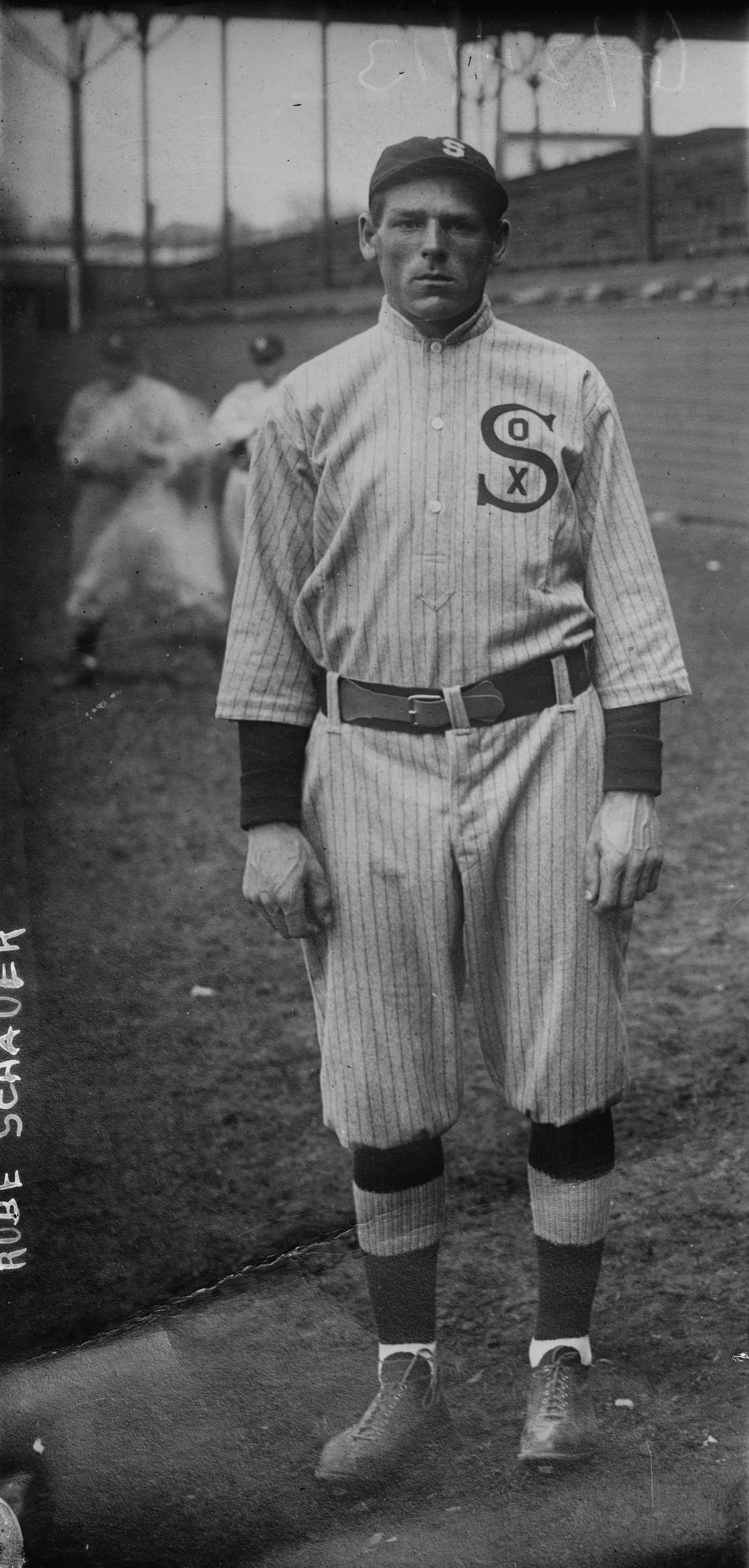
A portrait of Rube Schauer wearing his Sox uniform in 1913
