= Eau Claire Commissioners =

- 1886–1912; (1886-1887, 1906-1907, 1909-1912)); Eau Claire, Wisconsin

Minor league affiliations
- Previous classes: Class D (1912); Class C (1911); Class D (1906-1907, 1909-1910)
- League: Minnesota-Wisconsin League (1909-1912)
- Previous leagues: Wisconsin State League (1906-1907); Northwestern League (1886-1887)

Team data
- Previous names: Eau Claire Commissioners (1910-1912); Eau Claire Puffs (1909); Eau Claire Tigers (1907); Eau Claire-Chippewa Orphans (1906); Eau Claire (1887); Eau Claire Lumbermen (1886)
- Previous parks: Driving Park

The Eau Claire Commissioners were a Minnesota–Wisconsin League minor league baseball team that played under that name from 1910 to 1912. The team was based in Eau Claire, Wisconsin. Notably, Major League Baseball Hall of Famer Burleigh Grimes played for the team. Jack Kading played for the club when they were the Puffs.
