= Red Wing Manufacturers =

The Red Wing Manufacturers were a Minnesota–Wisconsin League minor league baseball team based in Red Wing, Minnesota that played from 1910 to 1911. It is the only known professional team to ever play in Red Wing. Major league players Joe Fautsch and Frank Gregory played for the team.
