= Grand Forks Chiefs =

- 1934–1964; (1934–1935, 1938–1942, 1946–1964); Grand Forks, North Dakota

Minor league affiliations
- Class: Class A (1963–1964); Class C (1941–1942, 1946–1962); Class D (1934–1940)
- League: Northern League

Major league affiliations
- Team: Los Angeles Dodgers (1964); Cleveland Indians (1963); Pittsburgh Pirates (1956–1962); Philadelphia Phillies (1951–1952); New York Yankees (1948–1950); Brooklyn Dodgers (1946); Chicago White Sox (1939–1942)

Minor league titles
- League titles (3): 1940; 1948; 1951

Team data
- Name: Grand Forks Chiefs
- Ballpark: Municipal Ballpark

The Grand Forks Chiefs were a minor league baseball team from Grand Forks, North Dakota. They played in the Northern League from 1934 to 1964, with a couple breaks in between.

== History ==
Minor league baseball first began in Grand Forks when the 1897 Grand Forks Senators became members of the Red River Valley League. They were followed by the Grand Forks Forkers who played as members of the Northern League (1902-1905) and Northern-Copper Country League (1906). The Grand Forks Flickertails played as members of the Central International League (1912) and Northern League (1913-1915).

The Grand Forks Chiefs began play in 1934, after Grand Forks had hosted the two previous teams in the Northern League. The Chiefs were a minor league affiliate of the Los Angeles Dodgers (1964), Cleveland Indians (1963, Pittsburgh Pirates (1956–1962), Philadelphia Phillies (1951–1952), New York Yankees (1948–1950), Brooklyn Dodgers (1946) and Chicago White Sox (1939–1942).

== Ballparks ==
The Chiefs played at home games at the Grand Forks Municipal Ballpark, which was located at 1124 Demers Avenue. Today, the site is the Central Fire Station.

== Notable alumni ==
Baseball Hall of Fame Alumni

- Willie Stargell (1960) Inducted, 1988

Notable alumni

- Bob Clear (1960-1961)
- Dave Garcia (1941)
- Dale Hackbart (1960) Became NFL football player.
- Ramon Hernandez (1959-1960)
- Johnny Hopp (1955) MLB All-Star
- Dick Jamieson (1958) Became NFL player
- Rex Johnston (1960) Played in NFL
- Bob Lee MLB All-Star
- Morrie Martin (1941)
- Jose Martinez (1961)
- Gene Michael (1959-1960)
- Johnny Mostil (1938-1939) 2× AL stolen base leader (1925, 1926)
- Glen Selbo (1947) Became NBA basketball player
- Dave Wickersham (1956)

== Year-by-year record ==
Year	Record	Finish	Manager	Playoffs
1934	59–60	6th	Johnny Anderson	
1935	46–66	6th	Johnny Anderson	
1938	49–66	6th	Johnny Mostil	
1939	49–68	7th	Johnny Mostil	
1940	79–44	1st	Fred Williams	League Champs
1941	64–48	2nd	Larry Bettencourt	Lost in 1st round
1942	31–84	8th	Bruno Haas	
1946	50–56	6th	Glenn Chapman / Rae Blaemire	
1947	28–92	8t	Claude Jonnard	
1948	80–39	1st	Gordon Hinkle	League Champs
1949	55–70	8th	Ed Kearse / Joe McDermott / Wally Berger	
1950	52–73	6th	Jack Farmer / Cedric Durst	
1951	64–62	4th	Eddie Murphy	League Champs
1952	38–86	8th	Eddie Murphy	
1953	55–70	6th	Carl Hosler / Frank Calo	
1954	43–91	8th	Virl Minnis / Frank Calo / Frank Major	
1955	39–85	8th	Johnny Hopp / Joe McDermott / Ray Fletcher	
1956	59–65	7th	Al Kubski	
1957	52–72	8th	Al Kubski / Jack Paepke	
1958	51–68	7th	James Adlam	
1959	57–68	6th	James Adlam	
1960	61–62	5th	Bob Clear	
1961	60–66	4th	Bob Clear	Lost in 1st round
1962	72–52	1st	Tom Saffell	Lost in 1st round
1963	54–64	5th	Ray Dabek	1st 17–11*
1964	69–50	2nd	James Williams	15–13 (3rd)*

* Baukol Playoffs based on last 30 days of season
