= Minnesota–Wisconsin League =

- Classification: Class D (1909–1910); Class C (1911); Class D (1912)
- Sport: Minor League Baseball
- First season: 1909
- Folded: 1912
- President: John A. Elliott (1909–1910); Frank Force (1911); John A. Elliott(1912)
- No. of teams: 8
- Country: United States of America
- Most titles: 1 Duluth White Sox (1909); Eau Claire Commissioners (1910); Superior Red Sox (1911); Winona Pirates (1912)
- Related competitions: Central International League

The Minnesota–Wisconsin League, known as the "Minny" League, was a professional minor baseball league that existed from 1909 to 1912. It was a Class D league in 1909, 1910 and 1912 and a Class C league in 1911. As its name suggests, it featured teams based in the states of Minnesota and Wisconsin.

== History ==
The inaugural 1909 Minnesota–Wisconsin League season featured the Duluth White Sox, Eau Claire Cream Puffs, La Crosse Outcasts, Winona Pirates, Wausau Lumberjacks and Superior Drillers as the six charter franchises in the league. The Duluth White Sox finished in first place, claiming the league championship.

In 1910, the Duluth White Sox, La Crosse Outcasts, Wausau Lumberjacks and Winona Pirates returned from 1909, while the Eau Claire Cream Puffs became the Eau Claire Commissioners and the Superior Drillers became the Superior Red Sox. The Red Wing Manufacturers and the Rochester Surgeons were newcomers to the league, which expanded to eight teams. The Eau Claire Commissioners finished in first place, winning the league championship.

In 1911, the league began play with the same teams as in 1910. During the season, the Red Wing and Wausau franchises both folded on June 26, 1911. The Superior Red Sox finished in first place, winning the league championship.

In 1912, the Minnesota–Wisconsin League began with four teams – the Eau Claire Commissioners, the La Crosse Outcasts, the Winona Pirates and the Rochester Bugs (formerly the Rochester Surgeons). Duluth and Superior left to form the Central International League. The Minnesota–Wisconsin League disbanded on July 1, 1912, with the Winona Pirates being the de facto league champion.

== Notable players ==
Hall of Fame members Dave Bancroft, 1909 Duluth White Sox, 1909 Superior Drillers, 1910–1911 Superior Red Sox and Burleigh Grimes, 1912 Eau Claire Commissioners, played in the league.

== Cities represented ==
- Duluth, MN: Duluth White Sox 1909–1911
- Eau Claire, WI: Eau Claire Cream Puffs 1909; Eau Claire Commissioners 1910–1912
- LaCrosse, WI: LaCrosse Outcasts 1909–1912
- Red Wing, MN: Red Wing Manufacturers 1910–1911
- Rochester, MN: Rochester Roosters 1910; Rochester Bears 1911; Rochester Bugs 1912
- Superior, WI: Superior Drillers 1909; Superior Red Sox 1910–1911
- Wausau, WI: Wausau Lumberjacks 1909–1911
- Winona, MN: Winona Pirates 1909–1912

== Standings & statistics ==
=== 1909 Minnesota-Wisconsin League ===
Team standings	W	L	PCT	GB	Managers
Duluth White Sox	65	42	.556	--	Thomas J. O'Brien
Eau Claire Cream Puffs	62	57	.521	4	Tom Schoonhover
LaCrosse Outcasts	60	56	.517	4½	Joe Safford
Winona Pirates	60	56	.517	4½	Joe Killian
Wausau Lumberjacks	54	66	.450	12½	Jack McCarthy
Superior Drillers	51	65	.440	13½	Lew Drill

Player statistics
Player	Team	Stat	Tot	Player	Team	Stat	Tot
Bill Bailey	Eau Claire	BA	.308	Phil Stremmel	Superior	W	22
Mike Malloy	LaCrosse	Runs	75	Frank Nicholson	Eau Claire	Pct	.800; 8–2
Russ Bailey	Eau Claire	Hits	143				
A.J. McCrone	Duluth	HR	6				

=== 1910 Minnesota-Wisconsin League ===
schedule

Team standings	W	L	PCT	GB	Managers
Eau Claire Commissioners	79	44	.642	--	Tom Schoonhover
Winona Pirates	69	54	.561	10	Joe Killian
Wausau Lumberjacks	69	55	.557	10½	Carl Bond
Superior Red Sox	64	57	.529	14	Arthur O'Dea / Jack Taylor
LaCrosse Outcasts	56	68	.451	23½	Joe Safford
Red Wing Manufacturers	51	67	.432	25½	Mike Malloy
Duluth White Sox	50	70	.417	27½	Thomas J. O'Brien
Rochester Roosters	46	69	.400	29	Jack Corrigan / Frank O'Leary

Player statistics
Player	Team	Stat	Tot	Player	Team	Stat	Tot
Dave Callahan	Eau Claire	BA	.365	Nicholas Lakoff	Winona	W	23
Dave Callahan	Eau Claire	Runs	92	Cy Dahlgren	Superior	Pct	.759; 22–7
Dave Callahan	Eau Claire	Hits	168				
Walter Altermatt	Duluth	HR	12				

=== 1911 Minnesota-Wisconsin League ===
schedule

Team standings	W	L	PCT	GB	Managers
Superior Red Sox	72	36	.667	--	Jack Taylor
Winona Pirates	71	45	.612	5	Joe Killian
Duluth White Sox	60	49	.550	12½	Thomas J. O'Brien
Eau Claire Commissioners	53	57	.482	20	Tom Schoonhover
LaCrosse Outcasts	47	68	.409	28½	Bumpus Jones / Carl Bond
Rochester Bears	40	71	.360	33½	Ted Corbett
Wausau Lumberjacks	21	22	.488	NA	Carl Bond / Buddy Dolan
Red Wing Manufacturers	13	29	.310	NA	Fred Cooke

Red Wing & Wausau disbanded June 26.

=== 1912 Minnesota-Wisconsin League ===
1912 Minnesota-Wisconsin League schedule

Team standings	W	L	PCT	GB	Managers
Winona Pirates	29	14	.674	--	Fred Curtis
Eau Claire Commissioners	25	17	.595	3½	Russell Bailey
LaCrosse Outcasts	15	26	.366	13	Carl Bond
Rochester Bugs	14	26	.350	13½	Art Lizzette

The league disbanded July 1.
