= Lew Krausse Sr. =

American baseball player (1912–1988)

Lew Krausse
- Pitcher
- Born: June 8, 1912; Media, Pennsylvania, U.S.
- Died: September 6, 1988 (aged 76); Sarasota, Florida, U.S.
- Batted: Right Threw: Right

MLB debut
- June 11, 1931, for the Philadelphia Athletics

Last MLB appearance
- September 2, 1932, for the Philadelphia Athletics

MLB statistics
- Win–loss record: 5–1
- Strikeouts: 17
- Earned run average: 4.50
- Stats at Baseball Reference

Teams
- Philadelphia Athletics (1931–1932)

Lewis Bernard Krausse (June 12, 1912 – September 6, 1988) was an American pitcher and scout in Major League Baseball from Media, Pennsylvania. He pitched in parts of the 1931 and 1932 seasons for the Philadelphia Athletics. Krausse was used mostly as a relief pitcher by the Athletics, though four of his 23 appearances were starts. He compiled a lifetime record of 5–1.

A standout high school pitcher at Upper Darby High School, Krausse was signed by Philadelphia in 1931, becoming the youngest player in the American League (AL). After making three appearances in 1931, he pitched in 19 games in 1932. His final start of the season was a shutout, but a sore arm prevented Krausse from ever pitching in the major leagues again after that. He did play several more seasons of Minor League Baseball, most notably with the Elmira Pioneers, with whom he won two championships. Following his final season in 1946, he spent many years as a scout for the Philadelphia Phillies and the Athletics. His older son, Lew Jr., won 68 games in the major leagues.

== Early life ==
Lewis Bernard Krausse was born on June 12, 1912, in Media, Pennsylvania. He attended Upper Darby High School, where he had a standout baseball career as a pitcher. A swift fastball was his primary pitch. The Philadelphia Athletics signed him and added him to the major league roster in 1931, making him the youngest player in the American League (AL) at the age of 18.

== Philadelphia Athletics (1931–1932) ==
=== 1931 ===
Krausse was seldom used by Philadelphia in 1931. He did not make his debut until the season's third month. Against the St. Louis Browns on June 11, he relieved Rube Walberg in the seventh inning after the latter had allowed six runs. Krausse pitched the final 2 1/3 innings of the game, allowing two runs himself as the Athletics lost 8–2.

Towards the end of the 1931 season, once Philadelphia had guaranteed itself a spot in the upcoming World Series, manager Connie Mack decided to rest star pitchers Walberg, Lefty Grove, and George Earnshaw. In the regular season's final games, he started the younger pitchers in their place. Making his first appearance since July and his first major league start, Krausse held the Boston Red Sox to four hits and one unearned run in a complete game, 7–1 victory on September 25.

In his three appearances in 1931, Krausse posted a 1–0 record and a 4.09 earned run average (ERA). He did not pitch in the World Series, which the Athletics lost in seven games to the St. Louis Cardinals.

=== 1932 ===
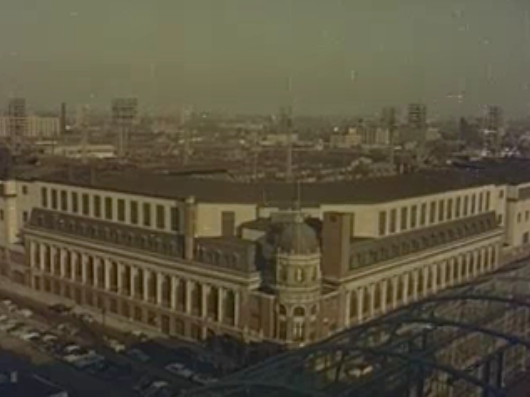
Shibe Park was where the Athletics played during Krausse's time with them.

After making $2,500 in 1931, Krausse was signed to a $3,000 contract in 1932. He pitched more frequently for the Athletics that season, mainly in relief, though he did start three games. On July 10, he started what Stephen V. Rice of the Society for American Baseball Research later called "one of the wildest and craziest games in baseball history" against the Cleveland Indians at League Park. Mack, with the team coming off three straight home doubleheaders and playing a single game series in Cleveland (necessitated by Pennsylvania's blue laws, which prohibited Sunday baseball) before returning home for another doubleheader, wished to save both train fare and the arms of his pitchers, taking only two pitchers with him, Krausse and veteran Eddie Rommel. After Krausse allowed four hits, including a three-run home run by Earl Averill in the first inning, Mack lost patience with his starter and replaced him on the mound for the second inning. Rommel pitched 17 innings in relief for the Athletics, who ultimately prevailed 18–17 in 18 innings.

Krausse only threw one shutout; it came in his final outing of the 1932 season. Facing the Red Sox in the second game of a doubleheader on September 2, and in only his second game since the end of July, Krausse held the team to six hits in a 15–0 victory. He finished his second season with a 4–1 record, a 4.58 ERA, 16 strikeouts, 24 walks, and 64 hits allowed in 57 innings pitched over 19 games. In 23 total games (four starts) over two seasons with the Athletics, Krausse had posted a 5–1 record, a 4.50 ERA, 17 strikeouts, 30 walks, and 70 hits in 68 innings.

== Sore arm (1933–1934) ==
Due to make $3,000 again in 1933, Krausse was sent to the minor leagues before the season began. A sore right arm prevented him from throwing as hard as he had when he debuted two years before. Though he would pitch in the minor leagues for several more seasons, Krausse never regained his former velocity or returned to the major leagues.

Beginning the year in the Class AA International League, Krausse split time between the Montreal Royals and the Albany Senators. During the season, his rights were acquired by the Boston Braves, who assigned him to the Class A Harrisburg Senators of the New York–Penn League (NYPL). Appearing in 11 games for Harrisburg, he posted a 3–4 record and a 3.74 ERA. In 1934, the Braves invited him to spring training, but he failed to make the major league roster and was assigned to Harrisburg again. He made 28 appearances for the Senators, posting an 8–11 record and a 5.01 ERA in 169 innings pitched.

== Elmira Pioneers (1935–1938) ==
For the 1935 season, Krausse joined the NYPL's Elmira Pioneers, who were not affiliated with any major league teams. In 40 games, he had a 15–11 record, a and a 4.09 ERA in 229 innings pitched. In 1936, the Brooklyn Dodgers purchased Elmira. That season, Krausse set a franchise record with a career-high 24 games won while only losing nine decisions. Aided by his contributions, the Pioneers won the NYPL's second-half pennant.

Elmira rebranded itself the "Colonels" in 1937, and Krausse appeared in 39 games, posting a 17–9 record and a 3.34 ERA in 210 innings pitched. The Colonels won the NYPL pennant by 6 1/2 games, then defeated the Hazleton Mountaineers and the Wilkes-Barre Barons in the playoffs to win the Governors' Cup, their first championship since 1914. He was invited to spring training by the Dodgers in 1938 but again failed to make the roster, getting reassigned to Elmira for his fourth season. Renamed the Pioneers, Elmira joined the Eastern League in 1938. Pitching 38 games, Krausse posted an 18–12 record and a 2.88 ERA in 275 innings. After rallying from two games down to defeat Binghamton in a best-of-five series, Elmira defeated Hazleton in the final round to win its second straight Governors' Cup. This would be Krausse's final season with Elmira, as that December the Dodgers traded him to the Cardinals for third baseman and outfielder Jimmy Outlaw, as well as cash.

In four seasons with Elmira, Krausse earned victories in 74 regular-season outings, as well as five postseason contests. "Lew was certainly the most popular pitcher to ever play in Elmira," Al Mallette, former editor of Elmira's Star-Gazette, declared in 1988. The ballplayer often returned to the town following his career, and he joined Sal Maglie and Pete Reiser as inaugural inductees of the Elmira Baseball Hall of Fame in 1961.

== Cardinals and Red Sox organizations (1939–1943) ==
Krausse was not in the Cardinals' organization for long. In 1939, he pitched three games for the Columbus Red Birds of the Class AA American Association before joining Boston's system, where he was assigned to the Little Rock Travelers of the Class A1 Southern Association. In 26 games (19 starts) for the Travelers, he had an 8–11 record and a 5.34 ERA. He allowed 182 hits in 140 innings pitched.

During the 1940 season, Krausse pitched for Little Rock and the Scranton Red Sox of the Eastern League. In 21 games (14 starts) for Little Rock, he had a 5–9 record and a 4.58 ERA. With Scranton, he had a 4–6 record but a lower 2.72 ERA in 13 games (10 starts).

Krausse remained with Scranton for each of the next two seasons. In 29 games in 1941, he had a 15–9 record, a 2.70 ERA, and 181 hits allowed in 193 innings pitched. Appearing in 26 games (21 starts) in 1942, he had a 10–10 record, a 2.93 ERA, and 171 hits allowed in 166 innings. He pitched briefly for the Lancaster Red Roses of the Class B Interstate League in 1943, posting a 3–2 record and 39 innings pitched in five games.

== Military and final season (1944–1946) ==
In 1944 and 1945, Krausse did not pitch in the minor leagues, as he was serving in the United States Army during World War II. He returned to the minor leagues in 1946 as the player-manager for the Federalsburg A's of the Class D Eastern Shore League. By this time, he was best known for his "assortment of curveballs". In 29 games, he had an 11–12 record, a 4.29 ERA, and 272 hits allowed in 216 innings pitched. The 1946 season was his last as a player. With a 37–87 record, Federalsburg finished last in the eight-team league.

== Post-playing career ==
In 1947, Krausse joined the other Philadelphia team, the Phillies, as a scout, serving in that capacity with the organization for the through the 1956 season. He was then hired in the same capacity by the Athletics, who had since moved to Kansas City. Krausse was assigned to evaluate players in the Midwestern United States. Filling out reports was the most time-consuming part of his job. "The hours aren't really too bad," he told reporters. He was very influential in the team's decision to sign his son to a $125,000 bonus contract in 1961. Lew Jr. won 68 games for the Athletics and four other MLB teams from 1961 to 1974.

== Personal life ==
Krausse was married to Lillian. In addition to Lew Jr., the couple had a younger son, whose name was Dave. While he was still playing, Lew Sr. and his brother operated a gas station in Media during the offseason. Lillian died of a heart attack in 1967. Two years later, Lew Sr. suffered one as well, though he survived and lived several more years. Eventually, he moved to Sarasota, Florida, where he died at the age of 76 on September 6, 1988.
