= Northern League (baseball, 1902–1971) =

North American baseball league

- Most recent season or competition: 1971 Northern League season
- Sport: Baseball
- Founded: 1902
- Folded: 1971
- Countries: United States; Canada
- Continent: North America
- Most titles: 10 Duluth/Duluth-Superior

The Northern League was a name used by several minor league baseball organizations that operated off and on between 1902 and 1971 in the upper midwestern United States and Manitoba, Canada. The name was later used by the independent Northern League from 1993 to 2010.

== Incarnations ==
The Northern League name represented four leagues in this time frame:

- First Northern League: 1902–1905
  - Northern-Copper Country League 1906–1907
- Second Northern League: 1908
  - Minnesota–Wisconsin League 1909–1911
  - Central International League 1912
- Third Northern League: 1913–1917
- Fourth Northern League: 1933–1971 (suspended operations 1943–1945 due to World War II)

== Historical overview ==
The first Northern League operated between 1902 and 1905. Charter members were the Winnipeg Maroons, Crookston Crooks, Fargo, Devil's Lake, Grand Forks and Cavalier.

In 1906, the league merged with the Copper Country Soo League to become the Northern-Copper Country League (1906–1907). A second Northern League was attempted in 1908, but did not finish its first season. The third Northern League appeared when the Central International League of 1912 expanded and changed its name in 1913. This third Northern League would last until 1917, when it was forced to disband due to a lack of players as a result of World War I.

The league did not re-emerge until 1933, when it began play with the Brainerd Muskies, Brandon Grays, Crookston Pirates, East Grand Forks Colts, Eau Claire Cardinals, Fargo-Moorhead Twins, Superior Blues and Winnipeg Maroons. The league did not operate between 1943 and 1945 because of a lack of manpower during World War II, and finally folded again in 1971.

While the Northern League in its various incarnations began as an independent loop in 1902, it joined organized baseball the following year. Under the old Minor League Baseball classification system it operated at Class D (l1903–1905, 1908, 1917, 1933–1940) and Class C (1913–1916, 1941–1942, 1946–1962). As a Class and Class D league, it was equivalent to a Rookie-level league today. The league operated as Class A from 1963–1971 under the modern minor league classification system. When the league folded after the 1971 season, the remaining teams were the Aberdeen Pheasants, Sioux Falls Packers, St. Cloud Rox and Watertown Expos.

== League champions ==
- 1902 Winnipeg Maroons
- 1903 Winnipeg Maroons
- 1904 Duluth White Sox
- 1905 Duluth White Sox
- 1906 Calumet Aristocrats (NCCL)
- 1907 Winnipeg Maroons (NCCL)
- 1908 Brandon Angels
- 1909 Duluth White Sox (MWL)
- 1910 Eau Claire Commissioners (MWL)
- 1911 Superior Red Sox (MWL)
- 1912 Duluth White Sox (CIL)
- 1913 Winona Pirates
- 1914 Duluth White Sox
- 1915 Fargo-Moorhead Graingrowers
- 1916 Winnipeg Maroons
- 1917 Fargo-Moorhead Graingrowers
- 1918–1932 league did not operate
- 1933 Superior Blues
- 1934 Fargo-Moorhead Twins
- 1935 Winnipeg Maroons
- 1936 Eau Claire Bears
- 1937 Duluth Dukes
- 1938 Duluth Dukes
- 1939 Winnipeg Maroons
- 1940 Grand Forks Chiefs
- 1941 Eau Claire Bears
- 1942 Winnipeg Maroons
- 1943–1945 league did not operate
- 1946 St. Cloud Rox
- 1947 Sioux Falls Canaries
- 1948 Grand Forks Chiefs
- 1949 Aberdeen Pheasants
- 1950 Sioux Falls Canaries
- 1951 Grand Forks Chiefs
- 1952 Superior Blues
- 1953 Fargo-Moorhead Twins
- 1954 Fargo-Moorhead Twins
- 1955 St. Cloud Rox
- 1956 Duluth-Superior White Sox
- 1957 Winnipeg Goldeyes
- 1958 Fargo-Moorhead Twins
- 1959 Winnipeg Goldeyes
- 1960 Winnipeg Goldeyes
- 1961 Aberdeen Pheasants
- 1962 Eau Claire Braves
- 1963 Grand Forks Chiefs
- 1964 Aberdeen Pheasants
- 1965 St. Cloud Rox
- 1966 St. Cloud Rox
- 1967 St. Cloud Rox
- 1968 St. Cloud Rox
- 1969 Duluth-Superior Dukes
- 1970 Duluth-Superior Dukes
- 1971 St. Cloud Rox

== Cities represented ==
- Aberdeen, South Dakota: Aberdeen Pheasants (1946–1971)
- Bismarck, North Dakota, and Mandan, North Dakota: Bismarck-Mandan Pards (1962–1964, 1966)
- Brainerd, Minnesota: Brainerd Muskies (1933); Brainerd Blues 1935
- Brainerd, Minnesota & Little Falls, Minnesota: Brainerd-Little Falls Muskies (1934)
- Brandon, Manitoba: Brandon Angels (1908), Brandon Grays (1933)
- Cavalier, North Dakota: Cavalier (1902)
- Crookston, Minnesota: Crookston Crooks (1902–1905); Crookston Pirates (1933–1941)
- Devils Lake, North Dakota: Devil's Lake (1902)
- Duluth, Minnesota: Duluth White Sox (1903–1905, 1908, 1913–1916, 1934); Duluth Dukes (1935–1942, 1946–1955)
- Duluth, Minnesota, & Superior, Wisconsin: Duluth-Superior White Sox 1956–1959; Duluth–Superior Dukes 1960–1970
- East Grand Forks, Minnesota: East Grand Forks Colts (1933)
- Eau Claire, Wisconsin: Eau Claire Cardinals (1933); Eau Claire Bears (1934–1942, 1946–1953); Eau Claire Braves (1954–1962)
- Fargo, North Dakota: Fargo (1902–1905); Fargo Browns (1908)
- Fargo, North Dakota, and Moorhead, Minnesota: Fargo-Moorhead Graingrowers (1914–1917); Fargo-Moorhead Twins (1933–1942, 1946–1960)
- Fort William, Ontario: Fort William Canadians (1914–1915)
- Fort William, Ontario and Port Arthur, Ontario: Fort William-Port Arthur Canadians (1916)
- Grand Forks, North Dakota: Grand Forks Forkers (1902–1905); Grand Forks Flickertails (1913–1915); Grand Forks Chiefs (1934–1935, 1938–1942, 1946–1963); Grand Forks Dodgers (1964)
- Huron, South Dakota: Huron Phillies (1965–1968); Huron Cubs (1969–1970)
- Jamestown, North Dakota: Jamestown Jimmies (1936–1937)
- La Crosse, Wisconsin: LaCrosse Colts (1913)
- Mankato, Minnesota: Mankato Mets (1967–1968)
- Minneapolis, Minnesota: Minneapolis Millers (1913)
- Minot, North Dakota: Minot Why Nots (1917); Minot Mallards (1958–1960); Minot Mallards (1962)
- St. Boniface, Manitoba: St. Boniface Bonnies (1915)
- St. Cloud, Minnesota: St. Cloud Rox (1946–1971)
- St. Cloud, Minnesota & Brainerd, Minnesota: St. Cloud-Brainerd (1905)
- Saint Paul, Minnesota: St. Paul Colts (1913)
- Sioux Falls, South Dakota: Sioux Falls Canaries (1942, 1946–1953); Sioux Falls Packers (1966–1971)
- Superior, Wisconsin: Superior Longshoremen (1903–1905); Superior Red Sox (1913–1915); Superior Blues (1933–1942, 1946–1955)
- Virginia, Minnesota: Virginia Ore Diggers (1913–1916)
- Warren, Minnesota: Warren Wanderers (1917)
- Watertown, South Dakota: Watertown Expos (1970–1971)
- Wausau, Wisconsin: Wausau Lumberjacks (1936–1939); Wausau Timberjacks (1940–1942); Wausau Lumberjacks 1956–1957
- Winnipeg, Manitoba: Winnipeg Maroons (1902–1905, 1908, 1913–1917, 1933–1942); Winnipeg Goldeyes (1954–1964, 1969)
- Winona, Minnesota: Winona Pirates (1913–1914)
