= Tucker Bradley =

American baseball player (born 1998)

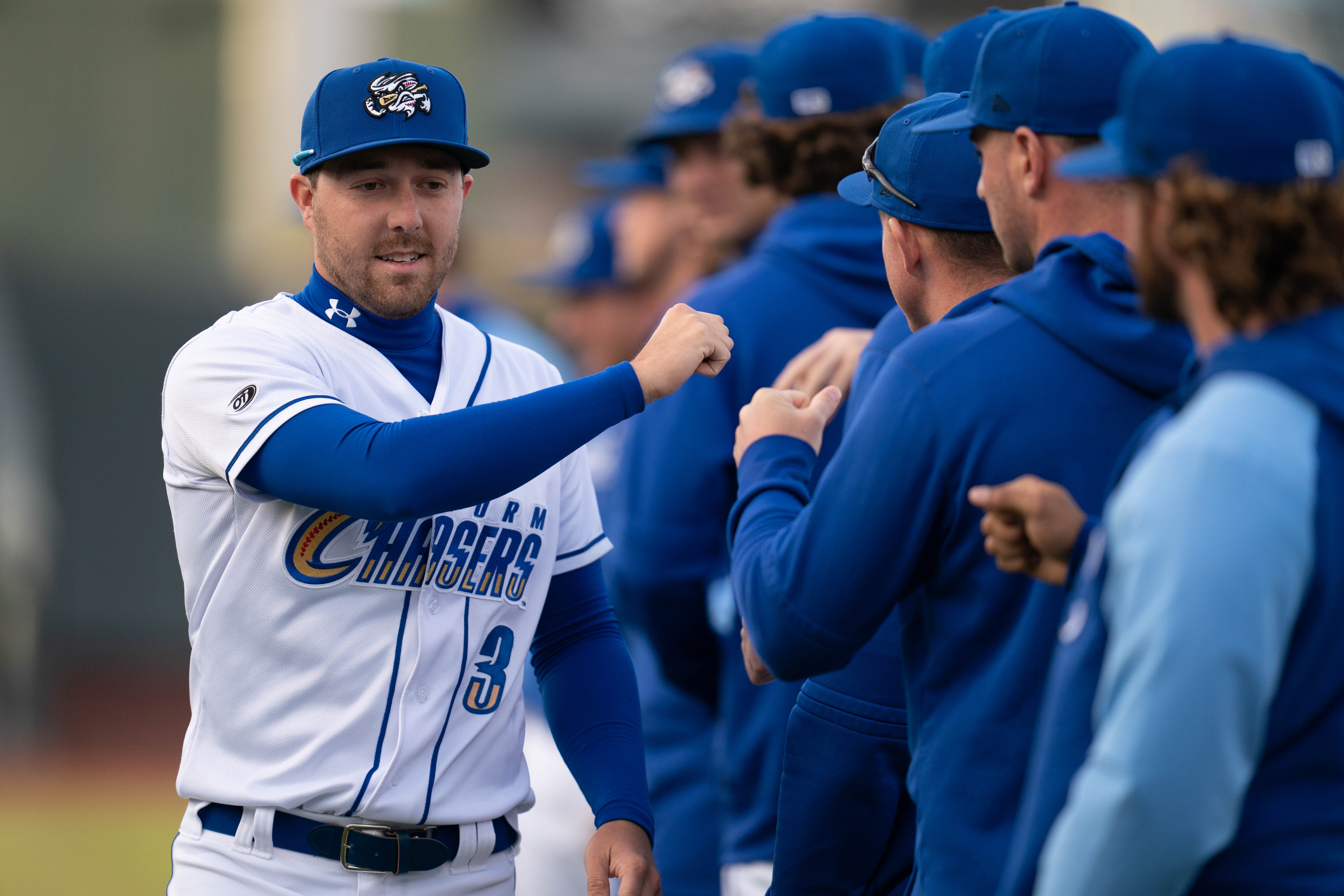
- Bradley with the Omaha Storm Chasers in 2023
- Outfielder
- Born: May 6, 1998 (age 27); Chickamauga, Georgia, U.S.
- Bats: Left Throws: Left

Tucker Wade Bradley (born May 6, 1998) is an American former professional baseball outfielder.

== Amateur career ==
Bradley attended Gordon Lee High School in Chickamauga, Georgia. As a senior in 2016, he batted .552 with nine home runs, 36 runs batted in, 23 stolen bases, and 12 doubles alongside pitching to a 1.12 earned run average over 50 innings and was named the Walker County Player of the Year. He signed to play college baseball at Auburn University, but later switched his commitment to the University of Georgia.

As a freshman at Georgia in 2017, Bradley started 41 games and hit .314 with ten runs batted in. For the 2018 season, he started 53 games and batted .300 with three home runs and 26 runs batted in. He played three games in 2019 before injuring his shoulder and missing the remainder of the season. Bradley played 18 games in 2020 in which he batted .397 with six home runs and 23 runs batted in before the season was cancelled due to the COVID-19 pandemic.

== Professional career ==
=== Kansas City Royals ===
Bradley went unselected in the shortened 2020 Major League Baseball draft and signed with the Kansas City Royals as an undrafted free agent. He did not play in a game in 2020 due to the cancellation of the minor league season because of the COVID-19 pandemic.

Bradley made his professional debut in 2021 with the Single–A Columbia Fireflies and was promoted to the High–A Quad Cities River Bandits in mid-May. Over 94 games, he batted .285 with six home runs, 45 runs batted in, and 12 stolen bases. He played the 2022 season with the Double–A Northwest Arkansas Naturals. Over 110 games, he had a batting average of .293 with a .382 on base percentage, a .455 slugging percentage, 12 home runs, 53 runs batted in, and 19 stolen bases. He was assigned to the Triple–A Omaha Storm Chasers to open the 2023 season, and he also played with Northwest Arkansas. Over 96 games between the two teams, Bradley batted .277 with seven home runs and 55 runs batted in.

Bradley was released by the Royals organization on April 22, 2024.

=== Kansas City Monarchs ===
On April 30, 2024, Bradley signed with the Kansas City Monarchs of the American Association of Professional Baseball. In 29 games, he batted .232/.342/.343 with 2 home runs and 7 runs batted in. On June 23, Bradley was released by the Monarchs. He announced his retirement from professional baseball on June 28.
