= Vidal Nuño =

American baseball player (born 1987)

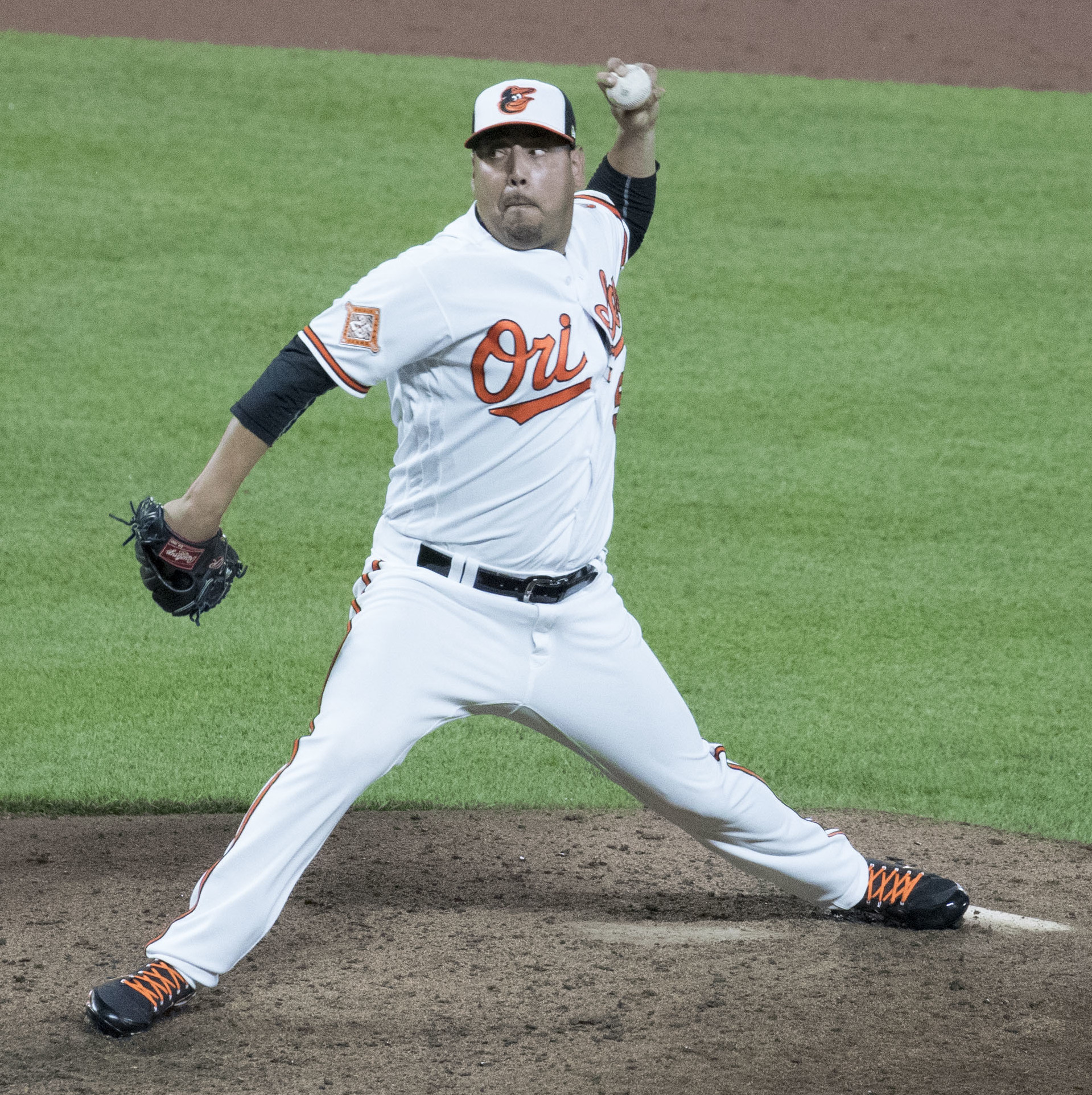
- Nuño with the Baltimore Orioles

Dorados de Chihuahua – No. 6
- Pitcher
- Born: July 26, 1987 (age 39); National City, California, U.S.
- Bats: Left Throws: Left

MLB debut
- April 29, 2013, for the New York Yankees

MLB statistics (through 2018 season)
- Win–loss record: 8–21
- Earned run average: 4.06
- Strikeouts: 312
- Stats at Baseball Reference

Teams
- New York Yankees (2013–2014); Arizona Diamondbacks (2014–2015); Seattle Mariners (2015–2016); Baltimore Orioles (2017); Tampa Bay Rays (2018)

Vidal Vicente Nuño [vee-dahl' nooh'-nio] (born July 26, 1987) is an American professional baseball pitcher for the Dorados de Chihuahua of the Mexican League. He has previously played in Major League Baseball (MLB) for the New York Yankees, Arizona Diamondbacks, Seattle Mariners, Baltimore Orioles, and Tampa Bay Rays. The Cleveland Indians selected Nuño in the 48th round of the 2009 Major League Baseball draft. He made his MLB debut in 2013 with the Yankees.

== Amateur career ==
Nuño attended Sweetwater High School in National City, California, where he played for the school's baseball team. As a junior, in 2004, Nuño recorded 107 strikeouts and was named the Mesa League Pitcher of the Year.

Due to his poor academic track record, Nuño could not receive a scholarship from a Division I school. Wanting to leave the San Diego metropolitan area, he attended Baker University in Baldwin City, Kansas, where he played college baseball for the Baker Wildcats in the National Association of Intercollegiate Athletics. In two seasons at Baker, Nuño had a 15–7 win–loss record. He was named the Heart of America Athletic Conference Pitcher of the Year as a junior in 2008.

== Professional career ==
=== Cleveland Indians ===
The Cleveland Indians selected Nuño in the 48th round of the 2009 Major League Baseball draft, with the 1,445th overall selection. That year, he pitched for the Mahoning Valley Scrappers of the Low–A New York–Pennsylvania League. He began the season as a relief pitcher, but was moved into the starting rotation. He finished the season with a 2.05 earned run average (ERA). In 2010, Nuño was promoted to the Lake County Captains of the Single–A Midwest League. After pitching to a 4.96 ERA in 21 games, the Indians released Nuño on March 26, 2011, and suggested that in order to continue his career, he should develop a changeup.

=== Washington Wild Things ===
Nuño began the 2011 season pitching in independent baseball for the Washington Wild Things of the Frontier League, where he worked on his changeup. In six games with the Wild Things, Nuño recorded a 2.83 ERA with 34 strikeouts.

=== New York Yankees ===
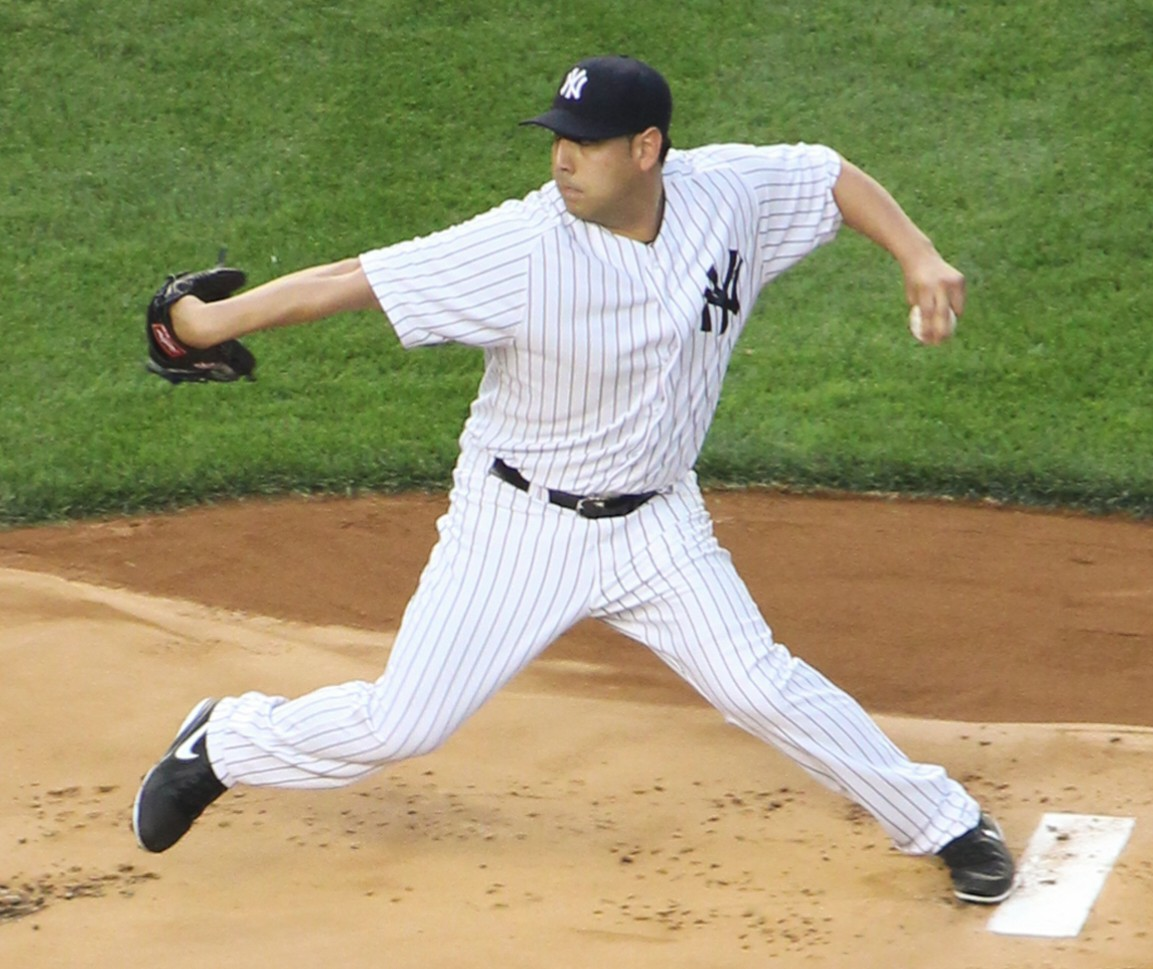
Nuno with the New York Yankees

On June 18, 2011, Nuño signed with the New York Yankees organization, and was assigned to the Staten Island Yankees of the New York–Penn League. He also pitched for the Charleston RiverDogs of the Single–A South Atlantic League. In 2012, Nuño played for the Tampa Yankees of the High–A Florida State League and Trenton Thunder of the Double–A Eastern League. Across both levels, Nuño pitched to a 10–6 win–loss record with a 2.54 ERA, the best among all Yankees' minor league pitchers, across 138 1/3 innings pitched.

The Yankees invited Nuño to spring training in 2013. He won the James P. Dawson Award as the best rookie in camp. Assigned to the Scranton/Wilkes-Barre RailRiders of the Triple–A International League, he was named the league's pitcher of the week for the week ending April 21, after he won both of his starts, allowing one run in 11 2/3 innings, with two walks and 14 strikeouts.

With Iván Nova on the disabled list, the Yankees promoted Nuño to the major leagues on April 27, 2013. He made his major league debut on April 29, pitching three scoreless innings in relief. On May 13, he made his second appearance, his first major league start, in the second game of a doubleheader against the Cleveland Indians. Nuño pitched five scoreless innings and got his first career win. The next day, the Yankees optioned Nuño to Scranton/Wilkes-Barre to activate Curtis Granderson from the disabled list.

On May 17, 2013, Nuño was recalled to the New York Yankees MLB roster, following an injury to Andy Pettitte that forced him to the 15-day disabled list. In a relief outing against the Baltimore Orioles on May 21, he recorded his first major league loss after surrendering a lead-off home run to Nate McLouth in the 10th inning. He was again optioned to Scranton/Wilkes-Barre on May 30, 2013. Nuño was placed on the disabled list in June and missed the remainder of the 2013 season.

Nuño competed with Michael Pineda, David Phelps, and Adam Warren for the final spot in the Yankees' starting rotation during spring training in 2014. Pineda won the final spot, and Nuño made the Yankees' Opening Day roster as a relief pitcher. After pitching in relief in three games, Nuño made his first start of the 2014 season on April 20. Nuño started 14 games for the Yankees, going 2–5 while allowing up 15 home runs in 78 innings.

=== Arizona Diamondbacks ===
On July 6, 2014, Nuño was traded to the Diamondbacks for pitcher Brandon McCarthy. Nuño pitched to a 3.74 ERA as a member of the Diamondbacks' starting rotation, but did not win a game in 14 starts, going 0–7 with the Diamondbacks and finishing the year with a win–loss record of 2–12 and a 4.56 ERA in 28 starts. Nuno began the 2015 season with the Reno Aces of the Triple–A Pacific Coast League. He was promoted to the majors on May 11 and made one appearance before he was optioned to Reno on May 16.

=== Seattle Mariners ===
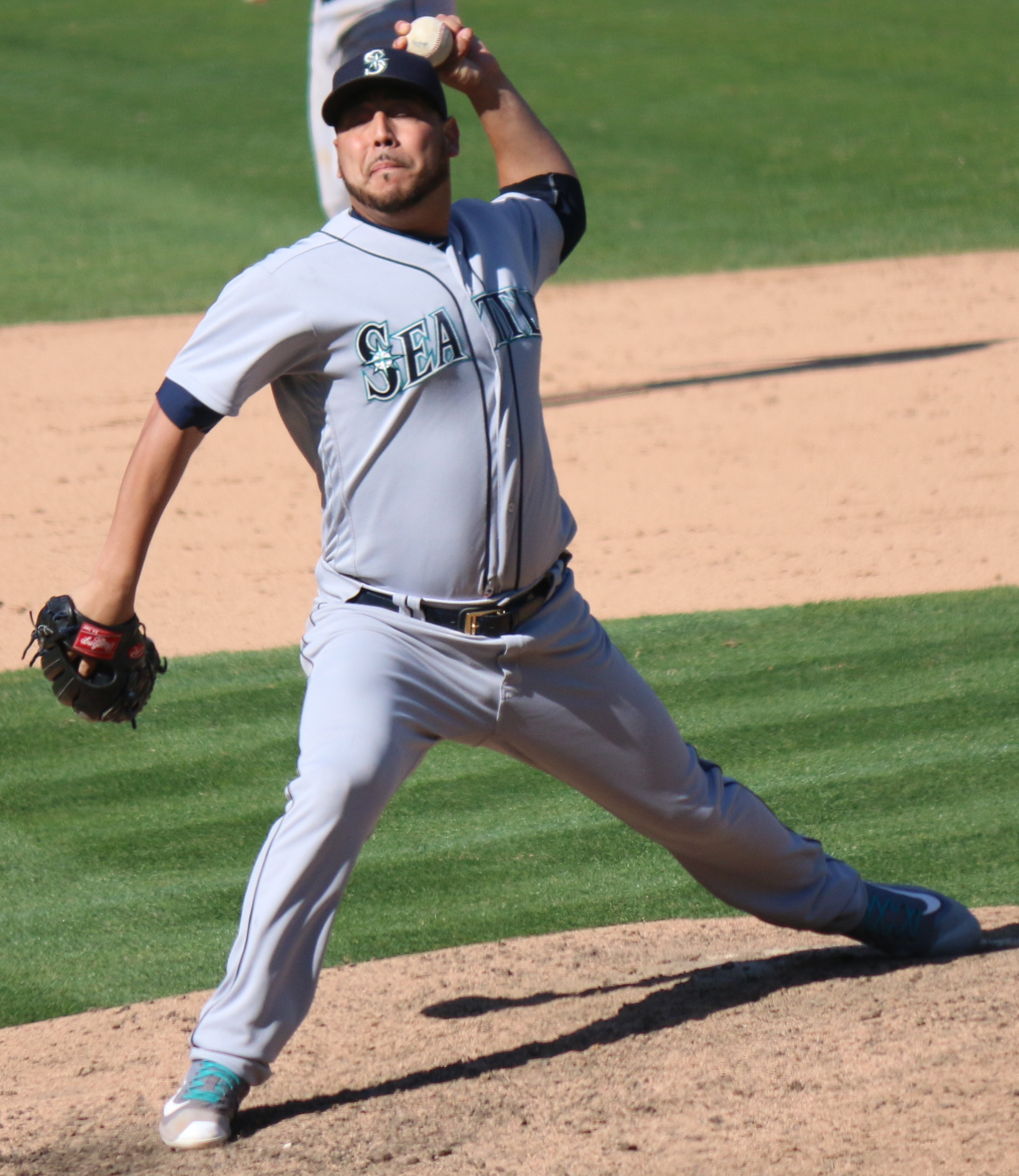
Nuño pitching for the Seattle Mariners

On June 3, 2015, the Diamondbacks traded Nuño and Mark Trumbo to the Seattle Mariners for catcher Welington Castillo, reliever Dominic Leone and prospects Gabby Guerrero and Jack Reinheimer. Nuño pitched to a 1–4 record with a 5.08 ERA in ten games started, and a 1.91 ERA in 25 appearances as a relief pitcher. When he won a start on September 9, it was his first major league victory since June 27, 2014, and he broke a string of 44 appearances and 20 starts without a win; his 20-start winless streak had been tied for the longest active streak without a win in the major league's with Atlanta's Shelby Miller.

In 2016, the Mariners determined that they would use Nuño solely as a relief pitcher. In 56 appearances, including one start, he posted a 3.53 ERA in 58 2/3 innings.

=== Baltimore Orioles ===
On November 6, 2016, the Mariners traded Nuño to the Los Angeles Dodgers for catcher Carlos Ruiz. Nuño and the Dodgers avoided salary arbitration on January 10, 2017, by agreeing to a one-year, $1.125 million contract. On February 19, he was traded to the Baltimore Orioles in exchange for minor league pitcher Ryan Moseley. In 12 appearances for Baltimore, Nuño struggled to an 0–1 record and 10.43 ERA with 13 strikeouts across 14 2/3 innings pitched. On August 23, Nuño was removed from the 40-man roster and sent outright to the Triple-A Norfolk Tides. He elected free agency on October 1.

=== Tampa Bay Rays ===
On November 7, 2017, Nuno signed a minor league contract with the Tampa Bay Rays organization. He began the 2018 season with the Triple-A Durham Bulls of the International League, and was promoted to the major leagues in May. Nuno ended the season with an earned run average of 1.64 in 33 innings (17 appearances) out of the bullpen. He threw a slider 67.0% of the time, tops in MLB. Nuño was removed from the 40-man roster on November 2, and sent outright to Durham. He subsequently elected free agency the same day.

=== Washington Nationals ===
On January 17, 2019, Nuño signed a minor league contract with the Washington Nationals that included an invitation to spring training. In 18 appearances for the Triple-A Fresno Grizzlies, he logged a 1–1 record and 7.25 ERA with 25 strikeouts and two saves across 22 1/3 innings pitched. Nuño was released by the Nationals organization on May 27.

=== Tampa Bay Rays (second stint) ===
On June 3, 2019, the Rays signed Nuño to a minor league deal. In 27 games for the Triple–A Durham Bulls, he recorded a 7.58 ERA with 33 strikeouts across 29 2/3 innings of work. Nuño became a free agent following the season on November 4.

=== Toros de Tijuana ===
On February 18, 2020, Nuño signed with the Toros de Tijuana of the Mexican League. Nuño did not play in a game in 2020 due to the cancellation of the Mexican League season because of the COVID-19 pandemic. Nuño recorded 11 scoreless innings in 2021 for Tijuana.

=== Los Angeles Dodgers ===
On June 1, 2021, Nuño signed a minor league contract with the Los Angeles Dodgers organization. He pitched in 18 games (seven starts) for the Triple–A Oklahoma City Dodgers, compiling a 6–2 record and a 6.58 ERA with 43 strikeouts over 53 1/3 innings.

=== Toros de Tijuana (second stint) ===
On February 28, 2022, Nuño signed with the Toros de Tijuana of the Mexican League. Nuño made seven appearances for Tijuana, logging a 1.35 ERA with six strikeouts in 6 2/3 innings pitched. On January 23, 2023, Nuño was released by Tijuana.

=== Acereros de Monclova ===
On March 8, 2023, Nuño signed with the Acereros de Monclova of the Mexican League. In 28 appearances for Monclova, he posted a stellar 0.86 ERA with 30 strikeouts in 31 1/3 innings pitched.

Nuño made 42 appearances for Monclova in 2024, recording a 3.06 ERA with 27 strikeouts across 32 1/3 innings of relief. He was released by the Acereros on February 12, 2025.

=== Charros de Jalisco ===
On April 18, 2025, Nuño signed with the Charros de Jalisco of the Mexican League. In 14 appearances for Jalisco, he struggled to a 1–1 record and 6.57 ERA with nine strikeouts across 12 1/3 innings pitched. Nuño was released by the Charros on June 8.

=== El Águila de Veracruz ===
On June 9, 2025, Nuño signed with El Águila de Veracruz of the Mexican League. He made 25 appearances for Veracruz, compiling a 2–1 record and 2.05 ERA with 21 strikeouts and seven saves over 22 innings of relief. Nuño was released by the team on March 6, 2026.

=== Dorados de Chihuahua ===
On July 8, 2026, Nuño signed with the Dorados de Chihuahua of the Mexican League.

== International career ==
He was selected Mexico national baseball team at the 2017 World Baseball Classic.

On October 29, 2018, he was selected as a member of the MLB All-Stars in the 2018 MLB Japan All-Star Series.
