= Welington Castillo =

Dominican baseball player (born 1987)

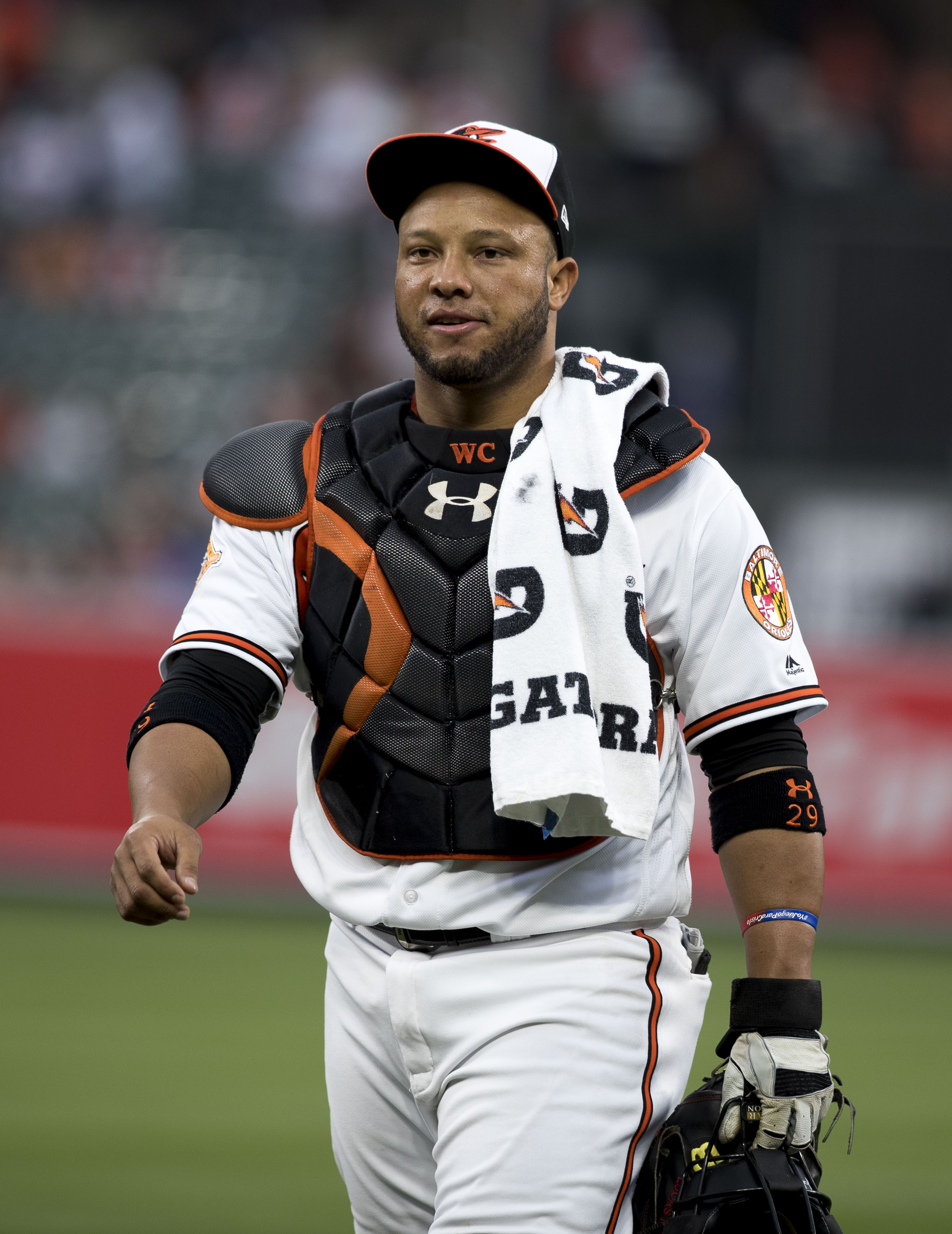
- Castillo with the Baltimore Orioles in 2017
- Catcher
- Born: April 24, 1987 (age 39); San Isidro, Dominican Republic
- Batted: Right Threw: Right

MLB debut
- August 11, 2010, for the Chicago Cubs

Last MLB appearance
- September 29, 2019, for the Chicago White Sox

MLB statistics
- Batting average: .254
- Home runs: 98
- Runs batted in: 339
- Stats at Baseball Reference

Teams
- Chicago Cubs (2010–2015); Seattle Mariners (2015); Arizona Diamondbacks (2015–2016); Baltimore Orioles (2017); Chicago White Sox (2018–2019)

Welington Andrés Castillo (born April 24, 1987), nicknamed "Beef" after Beef Wellington, is a Dominican former professional baseball catcher. He played in Major League Baseball (MLB) for the Chicago Cubs, Seattle Mariners, Arizona Diamondbacks, Baltimore Orioles, and Chicago White Sox.

== Baseball career ==
=== Chicago Cubs ===
==== Minor leagues ====
Castillo was signed as an amateur free agent by the Chicago Cubs in 2004.

Castillo began his professional career in 2006, playing for the rookie–level Arizona League Cubs (seven games) and Low–A Boise Hawks (three games), hitting a combined .188. In 2007, he hit .271 with 11 home runs and 44 runs batted in (RBI) for the Single–A Peoria Chiefs. He split 2008 between the High–A Daytona Cubs (33 games), Double–A Tennessee Smokies (57 games) and Triple–A Iowa Cubs (one game), hitting .287 with four home runs in 91 games. With the Smokies again in 2009, Castillo's average dropped to .232; however, he hit 11 home runs with 32 RBI in 319 at–bats.

Castillo began 2010 with the Iowa Cubs and hit .255 with 13 home runs and 59 RBI with them. He spent most of 2011 with Iowa, hitting .286 with 15 home runs in 61 games, but he also played two games with the Arizona League Cubs and 12 games with Daytona, hitting a combined .287 with 16 home runs. In the minors, he hit .268 with eight home runs and 28 RBI in 49 games split between Iowa and Tennessee.

==== Major leagues ====
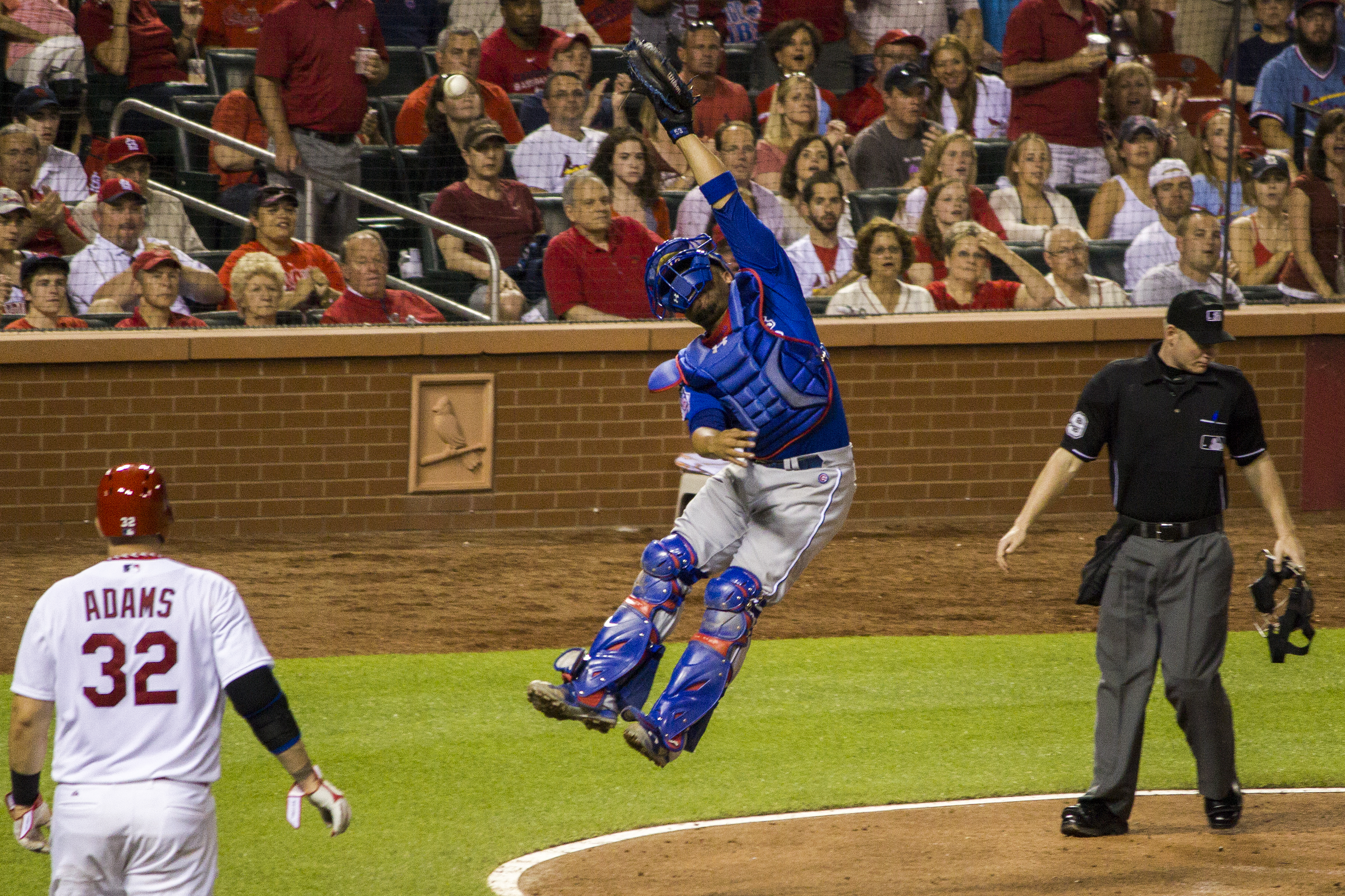
Castillo making a play in 2014

Castillo was called up by the Cubs on August 10, 2010, and spent seven games in the major leagues, hitting .300 with a home run, four doubles and five RBI. Castillo also played in four games with Chicago, from May 12–25 while Geovany Soto was on the disabled list (DL). In those games, Castillo hit .154 in 13 at–bats.

On April 28, 2012, Castillo was recalled from Iowa after backup catcher Steve Clevenger was placed on the DL. He was hitting .320 with two home runs and eight RBI in 16 games at Iowa. He played 52 games at the major league level, hitting .265 with five home runs and 22 RBI. Castillo played in 113 games in 2013, hitting .274/.349/.397 with eight home runs and 32 RBI. Castillo was the starting catcher for the Cubs in 2014, playing in 110 games and hitting .237/.296/.389 with 13 home runs and 46 RBI.

ESPN in December reported speculation that Castillo could be traded prior to the 2015 season, as the Cubs were expected to start newly acquired catcher Miguel Montero.

=== Seattle Mariners ===
On May 19, 2015, Castillo was traded to the Seattle Mariners in exchange for pitcher Yoervis Medina.

=== Arizona Diamondbacks ===
On June 3, 2015, the Mariners traded Castillo, Dominic Leone, Gabby Guerrero, and Jack Reinheimer to the Arizona Diamondbacks in exchange for Mark Trumbo and Vidal Nuño.

=== Baltimore Orioles ===
Castillo signed a one-year, $6 million contract with the Baltimore Orioles on December 16, 2016. The contract included a $7 million player option for the 2018 season. In his Orioles debut, Castillo went 2–for–4 and collected a double on Opening Day. He drove in his first run as an Oriole on April 8, in a 5–4 victory over the New York Yankees. Castillo's first home run with the team came on April 28, in a 14–11 loss to the New York Yankees. in the month of April, Castillo played in 17 games for the Orioles, slashing .314/.333/.443 with six doubles, a home run and six RBI.

On May 2, Castillo was placed on the 10–day disabled list with right shoulder tendinitis. He returned to the Orioles on May 16, where he collected three hits and a pair of RBI. Castillo would collect three hits a piece in each of his next two games, extending his streak of games with three hits to four. He became the first catcher since 1974 to do so, and just the third catcher since 1913 to accomplish the feat. In a May 19 game against the Blue Jays, Castillo hit his first home run at Camden Yards as a member of the Orioles. He would later hit a two–run home run in the tenth inning of the same game to walk it off for the Orioles. This streak ended the next night, however: he hit a go-ahead, game-winning three-run home run in the seventh inning to lead to Orioles to a 7–5 victory. It gave Castillo an RBI in six consecutive games and extended his overall hit streak to nine games.

Castillo was again placed on the 10–day DL on May 31 after taking a deflected pitch in the groin area. He was activated off the DL on June 10 and was immediately slotted back into the Orioles' starting lineup. On June 14, Castillo hit his first career grand slam off former Oriole Miguel González, giving the Orioles an 8–5 lead over the White Sox and helping the Orioles end a six-game skid. He also collected a career-high five RBI during the game.

=== Chicago White Sox ===
On December 1, 2017, Castillo signed a two–year, $15 million contract with the Chicago White Sox. The contract included an $8 million option for the 2020 season. On May 24, 2018, Castillo received an 80-game suspension for testing positive on Erythropoietin.

On October 31, 2019, Castillo was traded to the Texas Rangers, along with international slot compensation, in exchange for Jonah McReynolds. The Rangers immediately declined the 2020 option on his contract, making him a free agent.

=== Washington Nationals ===
On January 24, 2020, Castillo signed a minor league contract with the Washington Nationals. On July 3, Castillo announced he would be sitting out the 2020 season due to the COVID-19 pandemic. He became a free agent on November 2.

On December 21, 2020, Castillo re-signed with the Nationals organization on a new minor league contract. Castillo appeared in 11 games for the Triple-A Rochester Red Wings, batting only .143/.351/.179 with no home runs and one RBI.

On July 4, 2021, Castillo announced his retirement from professional baseball.

== See also ==
- List of Major League Baseball players suspended for performance-enhancing drugs
