= Gabriel Guerrero =

Dominican baseball player (born 1993)

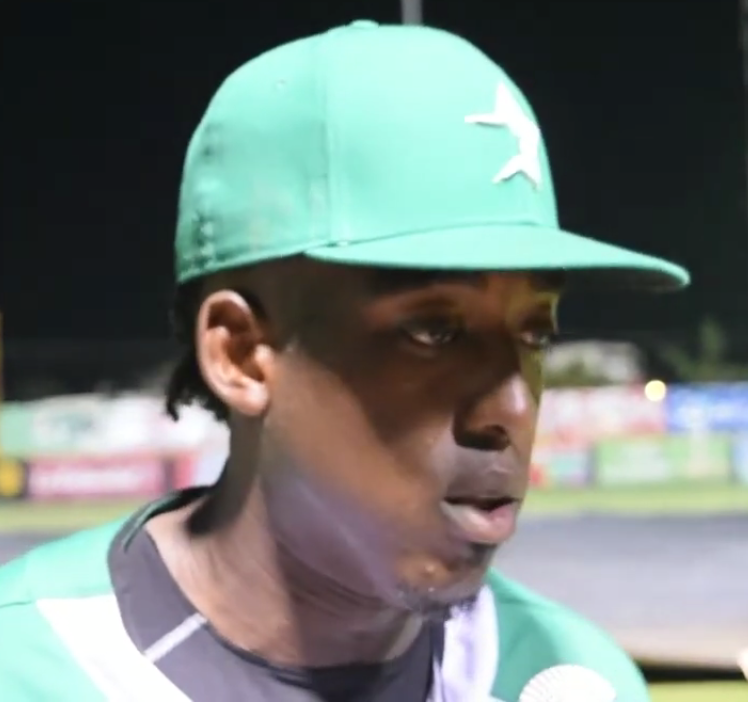
- Guerrero with Estrellas Orientales in 2017
- Outfielder
- Born: December 11, 1993 (age 32); Nizao, Dominican Republic
- Batted: Right Threw: Right

MLB debut
- September 4, 2018, for the Cincinnati Reds

Last MLB appearance
- September 30, 2018, for the Cincinnati Reds

MLB statistics
- Batting average: .167
- Home runs: 1
- Runs batted in: 1
- Stats at Baseball Reference

Teams
- Cincinnati Reds (2018)

Gabriel Guerrero Martinez (born December 11, 1993) is a Dominican former professional baseball outfielder. He played in Major League Baseball (MLB) for the Cincinnati Reds.

== Professional career ==
=== Seattle Mariners ===
Guerrero signed with the Seattle Mariners as an international free agent on February 10, 2011. He made his professional debut that year with the Rookie-level DSL Mariners, batting .236/.288/.298 with one home run and 14 RBIs in 57 games. In 2012, he started the season with the DSL Mariners before relocating to the United States late in the season to play with the Rookie-level AZL Mariners, batting a combined .349/.393/.593 with 15 home runs and 72 RBIs in 68 games. In 2013, Guerrero played for the Clinton LumberKings, batting .271/.303/.358 with four home runs and 50 RBIs in 125 games. In 2014, he played with the High Desert Mavericks, making an appearance in the mid-season All-Star Futures Game, an exhibition game hosted by the MLB that showcases the top minor league prospects. He finished the season batting .307/.347/.467 with 18 home runs and 96 RBIs in 131 games. Guerrero began the 2015 season playing for the Double-A Jackson Generals before being traded to the Arizona Diamondbacks on June 3, 2015, batting .215/.262/.305 with two home runs and 15 RBIs in 48 games for the Generals.

=== Arizona Diamondbacks ===
Guerrero began the 2015 season with the Mariners Double-A affiliate Jackson Generals before being traded to the Arizona Diamondbacks on June 3, 2015, along with Welington Castillo, Dominic Leone, and Jack Reinheimer in exchange for Mark Trumbo and Vidal Nuño. He finished the season with the Double-A Mobile BayBears, batting a combined .222/.258/.343 with seven home runs and 47 RBIs in 126 games. On November 20, 2015, the Diamondbacks added Guerrero to their 40-man roster to protect him from the Rule 5 draft. In 2016, Guerrero split time between the BayBears and the Triple-A Reno Aces, batting a combined .234/.281/.383 with nine home runs and 54 RBIs in 126 games. On November 18, 2016, Guerrero was designated for assignment by the Diamondbacks.

=== Cincinnati Reds ===
On November 28, 2016, Guerrero was claimed off waivers by the Cincinnati Reds organization. He was non-tendered on December 2, and re-signed to a minor league contract on December 4.

Guerrero was selected to the 40-man roster and promoted to the MLB for the first time on September 3, 2018, and made his debut the next day. On October 3, he was outrighted to the minors and removed from the Reds' 40-man roster. Guerrero elected free agency on November 2.

=== Miami Marlins ===
On November 14, 2018, Guerrero signed a minor league contract with the Miami Marlins. He was assigned to the Triple-A New Orleans Baby Cakes to begin the 2019 season. In 105 games for New Orleans (and 9 games for the Double-A Jacksonville Jumbo Shrimp, Guerrero hit .254/.270/.401 with 11 home runs and 51 RBIs. He elected free agency following the season on November 4, 2019.

=== Toronto Blue Jays ===
On January 21, 2020, Guerrero signed a minor league contract with the Toronto Blue Jays organization. Guerrero did not play in a game in 2020 due to the cancellation of the minor league season because of the COVID-19 pandemic. He became a free agent on November 2.

=== Kansas City Monarchs ===
On April 5, 2021, Guerrero signed with the Kansas City Monarchs of the American Association of Professional Baseball. He played in 96 games for the team, batting .319/.356/.485 with 18 home runs and 86 RBIs.

In 2022, Guerrero was named an All-Star after batting .305/.361/.485 with eight home runs and 33 RBIs in 48 games. On July 15, 2022, Guerrero retired from professional baseball.

== Personal life ==
Guerrero comes from a family with strong connections to baseball. His uncles, Vladimir Guerrero Sr. and Wilton Guerrero, played in Major League Baseball (MLB), while his cousin Vladimir Guerrero Jr. currently plays as a first baseman for the Toronto Blue Jays.
