= Justin O'Conner =

American baseball player (born 1992)

Gary SouthShore RailCats – No. 51
- Catcher
- Born: March 31, 1992 (age 34); Indianapolis, Indiana, U.S.
- Bats: Right Throws: Right
- Stats at Baseball Reference

Justin Douglas O'Conner (born March 31, 1992) is an American professional baseball catcher for the Gary SouthShore RailCats of the American Association of Professional Baseball. He was drafted 31st overall in the 2010 Major League Baseball draft by the Tampa Bay Rays.

== Career ==
=== Tampa Bay Rays ===
O'Conner attended Cowan High School in Cowan, Indiana. He was drafted by the Tampa Bay Rays in the first round, 31st overall, of the 2010 Major League Baseball draft. He made his professional debut that season with the Gulf Coast League Rays. He played in only 48 games for the rookie-level Princeton Rays in 2011 after suffering a torn hip labrum. He played for the Low-A Hudson Valley Renegades in 2012, batting .223/.276/.370 in 59 games. O'Conner played in 102 games for the Single-A Bowling Green Hot Rods in 2013, slashing .233/.290/.381 with 14 home runs and 56 RBI. After the season, he played in the Australian Baseball League. O'Conner started 2014 with the Charlotte Stone Crabs. He was selected to play in the All-Star Futures Game in July. O'Conner finished the 2014 season with a slash of .278/.316/.466 with 12 home runs and 47 RBI in 101 total games between Charlotte and the Double-A Montgomery Biscuits.

O'Conner was selected to the 40-man roster following the season on November 20, 2014. In 2015, O'Conner returned to Montgomery, playing in 107 games and batting .231/.255/.371 with 9 home runs and 53 RBI. O'Conner missed almost all of the 2016 season due to injury trouble, playing in only 20 total games. On December 12, 2016, O'Conner was designated for assignment by the Rays. He was outrighted to Triple-A on December 16. O'Conner split the 2017 season between Montgomery and the Triple-A Durham Bulls, hitting a cumulative .227/.288/.372 with 8 home runs and 44 RBI in 85 games between the two teams. He elected free agency on November 6, 2017.

=== San Francisco Giants ===
On January 25, 2018, O'Conner signed a minor league deal with the San Francisco Giants. He was released on March 26, 2018. After his release from the Giants organization, on April 4, 2018, O'Conner was suspended 50 games after testing positive a second time for a drug of abuse.

=== St. Paul Saints ===
On April 16, 2018, O'Conner signed with the St. Paul Saints of the independent American Association. O'Conner played in 82 games for St. Paul in 2018, posting a slash of .250/.292/.459 with 17 home runs and 41 RBI.

=== Chicago White Sox ===
On January 22, 2019, O'Conner's contract was purchased by the Chicago White Sox organization. O'Conner had converted to pitching for the 2019 season. O'Conner made 14 appearances for the rookie-level AZL White Sox and Single-A Kannapolis Intimidators, pitching to a 4.50 ERA with 17 strikeouts in 14.0 innings pitched. He elected free agency following the season on November 4.

=== New York Yankees ===
On December 14, 2019, O'Conner signed a minor league contract with the New York Yankees organization. O'Conner did not play in a game in 2020 due to the cancellation of the minor league season because of the COVID-19 pandemic. O'Conner didn't appear for any Yankees affiliate in 2021 due to injury. He elected free agency following the season on November 7, 2021, without having appeared in a game for the Yankees organization.

=== Staten Island FerryHawks ===
On June 14, 2022, O'Conner signed with the Staten Island FerryHawks of the Atlantic League of Professional Baseball. He played in 24 games for the FerryHawks down the stretch, hitting .270/.321/.419 with 2 home runs and 16 RBI. He became a free agent following the season.

On March 7, 2023, O'Conner re-signed with the FerryHawks for the 2023 season. He played in only 7 games, going 5-for-21 (.238) with no home runs and 1 RBI before he was released on May 12.

=== Charleston Dirty Birds ===
On May 19, 2023, O'Conner signed with the Charleston Dirty Birds of the Atlantic League of Professional Baseball. In 87 games for Charleston, O'Conner batted .263/.336/.457 with 12 home runs, 46 RBI, and 5 stolen bases.

=== Rieleros de Aguascalientes ===
On January 18, 2024, O'Conner signed with the Cleburne Railroaders of the American Association of Professional Baseball. However, on January 28, O'Conner signed with the Rieleros de Aguascalientes of the Mexican League. In 47 games, he batted .215/.267/.363 with five home runs and 21 RBI. On July 5, O'Conner was released by the Rieleros.

=== Kansas City Monarchs ===
On August 3, 2024, O'Conner signed with the Kansas City Monarchs of the American Association of Professional Baseball. In 28 games for the Monarchs, he slashed .308/.357/.529 with six home runs and 17 RBI.

=== Long Island Ducks ===
On January 30, 2025, O'Conner signed with the Long Island Ducks of the Atlantic League of Professional Baseball. He made 65 appearances for the Ducks, batting .247/.321/.377 with four home runs, 35 RBI, and two stolen bases. O'Conner became a free agent following the season.

=== Gary SouthShore RailCats ===
On April 24, 2026, O'Conner signed with the Gary SouthShore RailCats of the American Association of Professional Baseball.
