= Damon Jones (baseball) =

American baseball player (born 1994)

- Pitcher
- Born: September 30, 1994 (age 32); Twin Falls, Idaho, U.S.
- Bats: Left Throws: Left

MLB debut
- August 10, 2021, for the Philadelphia Phillies

MLB statistics (through 2022 season)
- Win–loss record: 0–0
- Earned run average: 9.00
- Strikeouts: 5
- Stats at Baseball Reference

Teams
- Philadelphia Phillies (2021–2022)

Matthew Damon Jones (born September 30, 1994) is an American professional former baseball pitcher. He has previously played in Major League Baseball (MLB) for the Philadelphia Phillies.

== Career ==
Jones attended Twin Falls High School in Twin Falls, Idaho. He played college baseball at the College of Southern Idaho and Washington State University.

=== Philadelphia Phillies ===
Jones was drafted by the Philadelphia Phillies in the 18th round, with the 533rd overall selection, of the 2017 Major League Baseball draft.

Jones made his professional debut with the Williamsport Crosscutters, going 2–3 with a 4.85 earned run average (ERA) over 26 relief innings. He played 2018 with the Lakewood BlueClaws, pitching to a 10–7 record and 3.41 ERA in 23 games (22 starts).

Jones started 2019 with the Clearwater Threshers, with whom he was named a Florida State League All-Star, before being promoted to the Reading Fighting Phils in June and the Lehigh Valley IronPigs in July. Over 23 starts between the three clubs, Jones went 5-4 with a 2.91 ERA, striking out 152 over 114 1/3 innings.

Jones did not play in a game in 2020 due to the cancellation of the minor league season because of the COVID-19 pandemic. On November 20, 2020, the Phillies added Jones to their 40-man roster to protect him from the Rule 5 draft.

On April 19, 2021, Jones was promoted to the major leagues for the first time. He was optioned down the next day without making an appearance. On July 11, Jones was again recalled to the majors after Alec Bohm, Connor Brogdon, Aaron Nola, and Bailey Falter were placed on the COVID-19 injured list. On July 16, Jones was again optioned down to Lehigh Valley without making an appearance. He made his MLB debut on August 10, pitching 1/3 of an inning against the Los Angeles Dodgers.

On June 27, 2022, Jones was placed on the 60-day injured list with a left shoulder impingement. He would miss the remainder of the season as a result of the injury. On November 9, Jones was removed from the 40–man roster and sent outright to Lehigh Valley.

Jones did not play in a game for the Phillies organization in 2023 and elected free agency following the season on November 6, 2023.

=== Olmecas de Tabasco ===
On July 3, 2024, Jones signed with the Olmecas de Tabasco of the Mexican League. He made one appearance for Tabasco, allowing one run on three walks with one strikeout in 1/3 of an inning.

=== Kansas City Monarchs ===
On July 7, 2024, Jones was loaned to the Kansas City Monarchs of the American Association of Professional Baseball. In 12 games for the Monarchs, Jones recorded a 3.46 ERA with 13 strikeouts across 13 innings pitched.

=== Olmecas de Tabasco (second stint) ===
On August 18, 2024, Jones was returned to the Olmecas de Tabasco of the Mexican League. However, he was released by the team on September 21.

== Personal life ==
Jones’ grandfather, Darrall Imhoff, played in the NBA.
