= Dominic Leone =

American baseball player (born 1991)

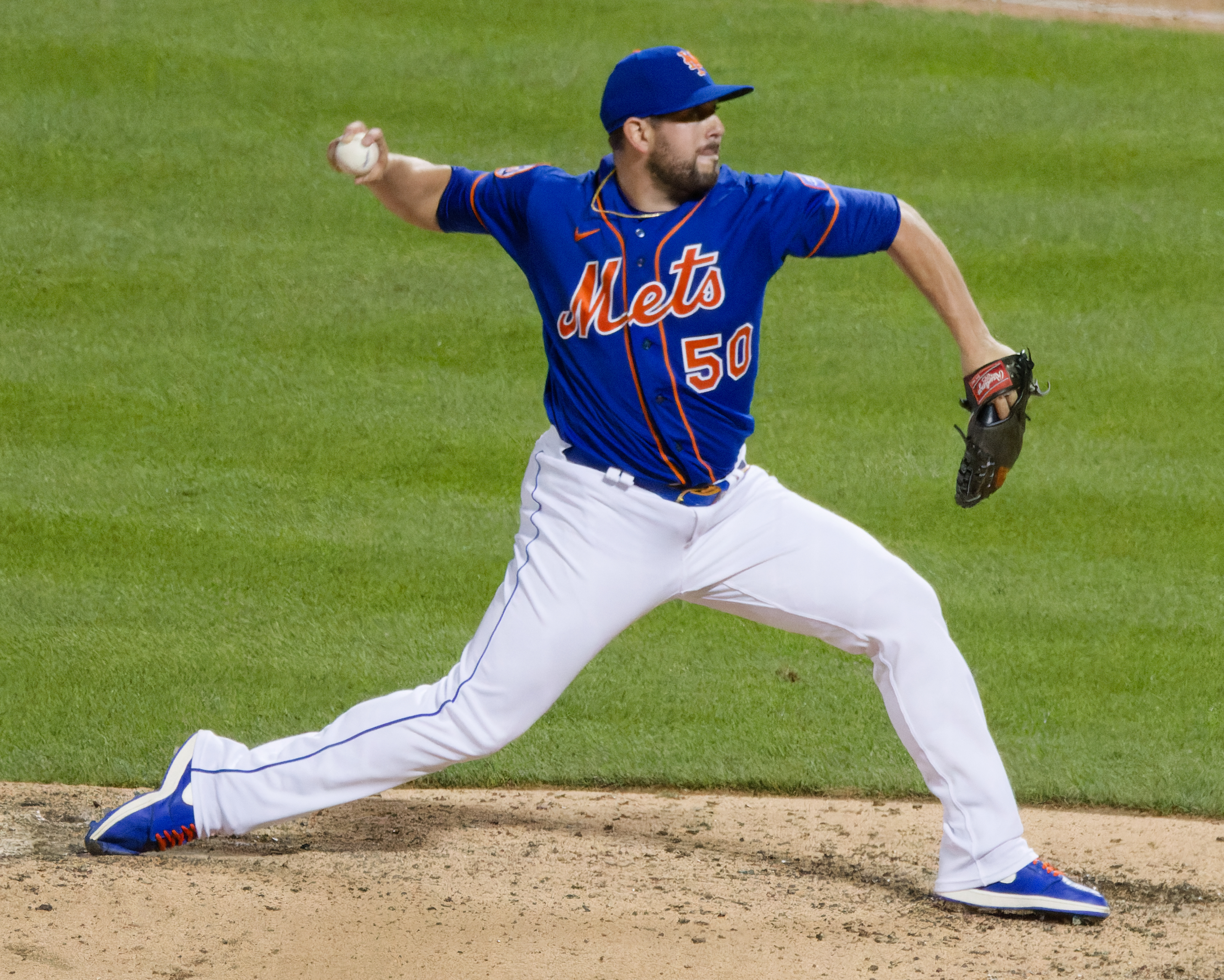
- Leone with the Mets in 2023
- Pitcher
- Born: October 26, 1991 (age 34); Norwich, Connecticut, U.S.
- Batted: Right Threw: Right

MLB debut
- April 6, 2014, for the Seattle Mariners

Last MLB appearance
- August 14, 2024, for the Chicago White Sox

MLB statistics
- Win–loss record: 22–25
- Earned run average: 3.94
- Strikeouts: 444
- Stats at Baseball Reference

Teams
- Seattle Mariners (2014–2015); Arizona Diamondbacks (2015–2016); Toronto Blue Jays (2017); St. Louis Cardinals (2018–2019); Cleveland Indians (2020); San Francisco Giants (2021–2022); New York Mets (2023); Los Angeles Angels (2023); Seattle Mariners (2023); Chicago White Sox (2024)

Dominic Joseph Leone (born October 26, 1991), nicknamed "Dominator", is an American former professional baseball pitcher. He played in Major League Baseball (MLB) for the Seattle Mariners, Arizona Diamondbacks, Toronto Blue Jays, St. Louis Cardinals, Cleveland Indians, San Francisco Giants, New York Mets, Los Angeles Angels, and Chicago White Sox. Leone played college baseball for the Clemson Tigers. The Mariners selected Leone in the 16th round of the 2012 Major League Baseball draft.

== High school and college ==
Leone attended Norwich Free Academy in Norwich, Connecticut, where he played for the school's baseball team. Undrafted out of high school, he enrolled at Clemson University, where he pitched for the Clemson Tigers baseball team.

When he was a true freshman, the Tigers turned to Leone in a game in which they faced postseason elimination; Leone won the game, which sent the team to the 2010 College World Series. A strained shoulder in his sophomore year led him to develop his off-speed pitches. After the 2011 season, he played collegiate summer baseball with the Chatham Anglers of the Cape Cod Baseball League. In his junior year, he had a 7–4 win–loss record and a 5.25 earned run average (ERA). While struggling in his junior year, Leone taught himself to throw a cutter by watching YouTube videos of Mariano Rivera.

== Professional career ==
=== Seattle Mariners ===
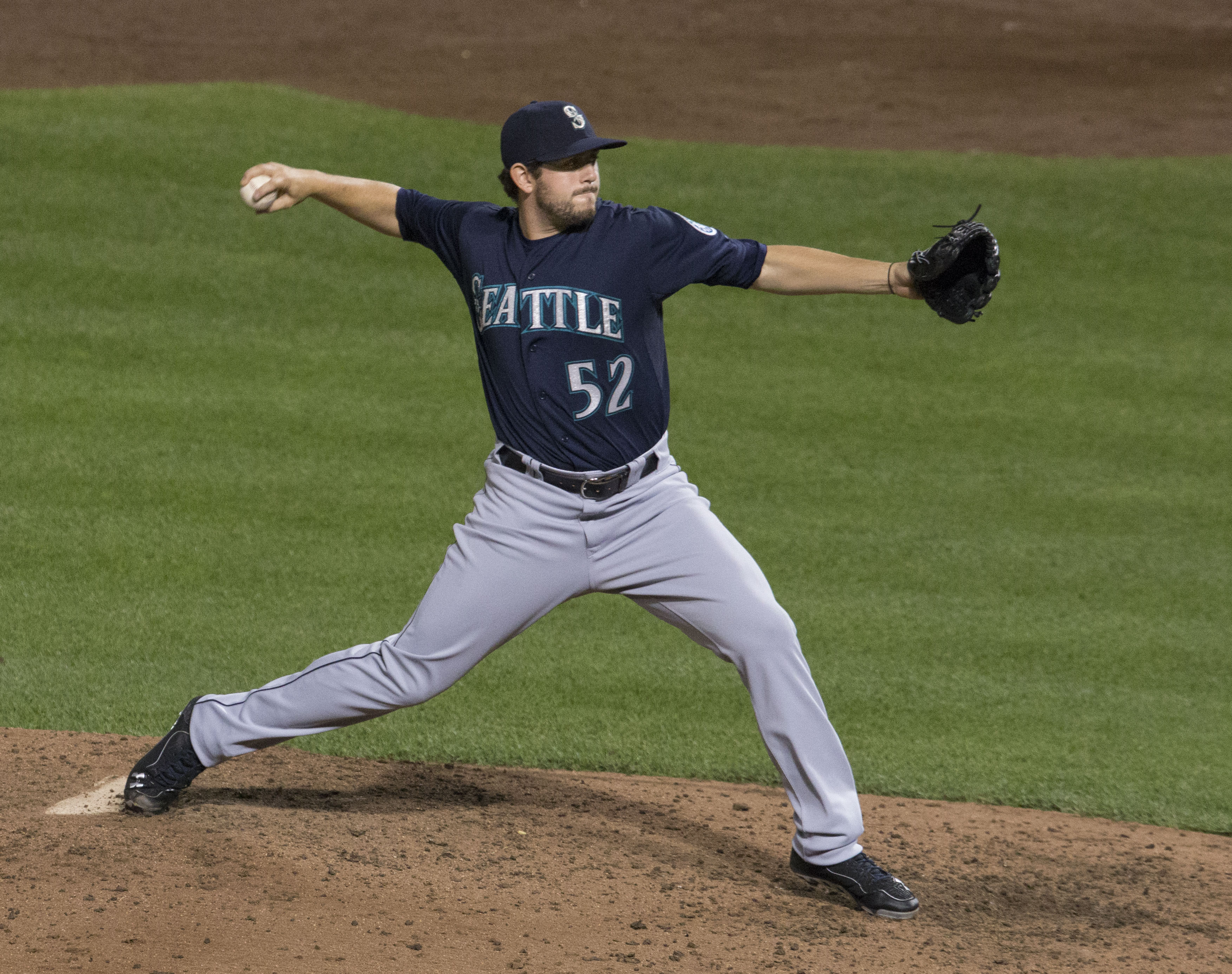
Leone with the Mariners in 2014

The Seattle Mariners selected Leone in the 16th round of the 2012 Major League Baseball draft, and he received a $100,000 signing bonus when he signed with the team. The Mariners assigned him to the Low-A Everett AquaSox, where he made 19 appearances and posted a 3–0 record, 1.36 ERA, and 39 strikeouts in 33 innings.

In 2013, Leone began the season with the Single-A Clinton LumberKings. After he pitched 6 1/3 scoreless innings for Clinton, the Mariners promoted Leone to the High-A High Desert Mavericks of the California League, where he served as their closer. In July, Leone was promoted to the Double-A Jackson Generals, where he ended the 2013 season. In 48 combined appearances across three minor league levels, Leone posted a 1–3 record, 2.25 ERA, and 64 strikeouts in 64 innings. In the offseason, he made 11 relief appearances for the Peoria Javelinas of the Arizona Fall League, and recorded a 3.00 ERA and 15 strikeouts.

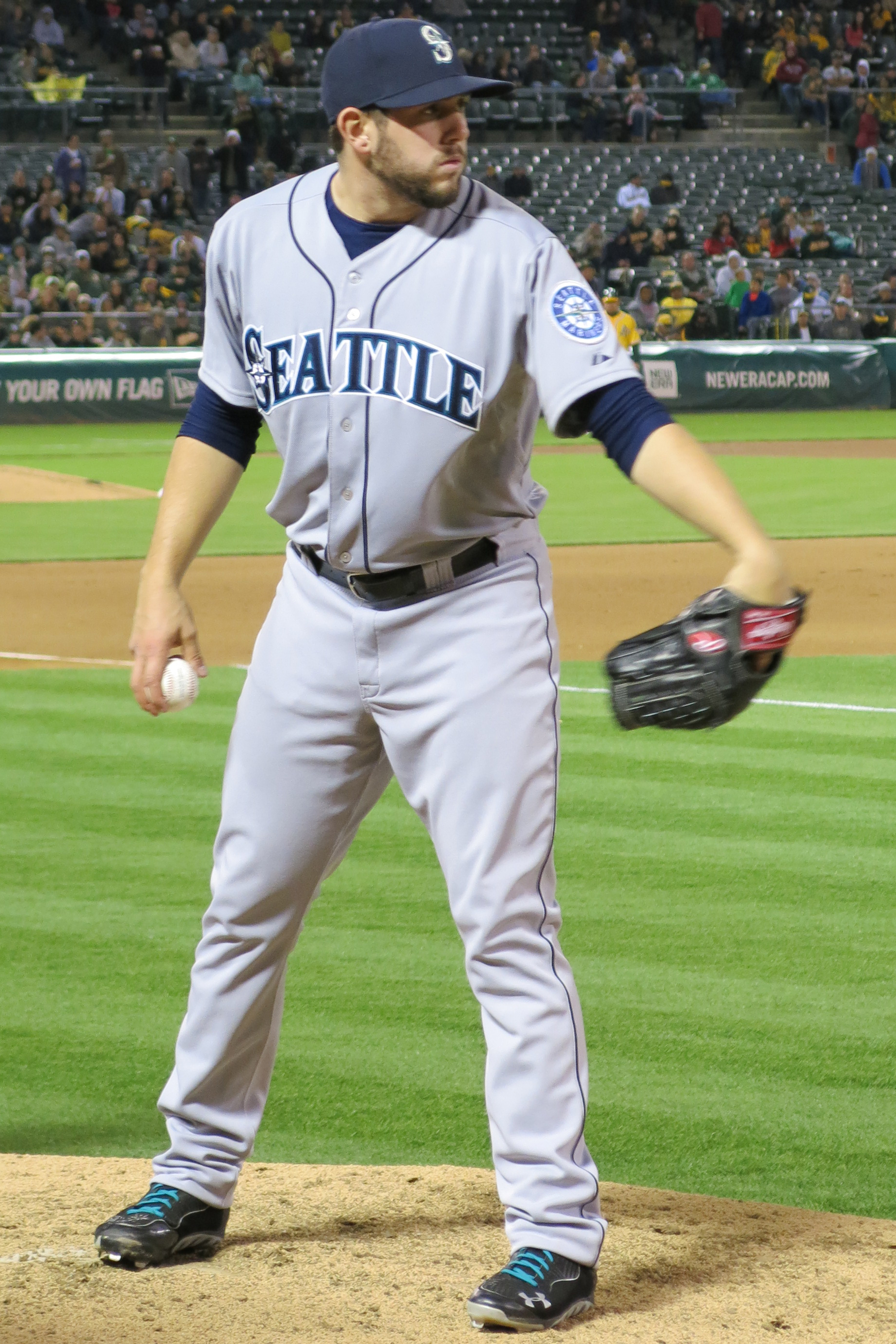
Leone with the Mariners in 2014

On April 4, 2014, the Mariners selected Leone's contract from the Triple-A Tacoma Rainiers of the Pacific Coast League, promoting him to the major leagues. He remained with the Mariners for the entire 2014 season, making 57 relief appearances and posting an 8–2 record, 2.17 ERA, and 70 strikeouts in 66 1/3 innings.

During spring training in 2015, Leone struggled with his command, and the Mariners assigned him to Triple-A Tacoma. When the Mariners placed Tom Wilhelmsen on the disabled list in early April, they promoted Leone. Leone made 10 appearances with the Mariners in 2015, posting a 6.35 ERA and nine walks in 11 1/3 innings. In the minors, he put up a 1–1 record, 7.71 ERA, and eight strikeouts in 9 1/3 innings.

=== Arizona Diamondbacks ===
On June 3, 2015, Leone, along with Welington Castillo, Gabby Guerrero, and Jack Reinheimer, was traded to the Arizona Diamondbacks for Mark Trumbo and Vidal Nuño. Leone made three appearances for the Diamondbacks in 2015, and went 0–1 with a 14.73 ERA in 3 2/3 innings. With the Double-A Mobile BayBears, Leone made 19 appearances and pitched to a 1–2 record, 3.90 ERA, and 28 strikeouts in 27 2/3 innings. Leone was ejected by Vic Carapazza in a game against the Miami Marlins for hitting Christian Yelich with a pitch in retaliation to Jose Fernandez hitting David Peralta earlier that game. In 2016, Leone split time between the Diamondbacks and the Triple-A Reno Aces. With Arizona he posted a 0–1 record, 6.33 ERA, and 23 strikeouts in 27 innings. With Reno, Leone went 5–2 in 33 relief appearances, and recorded a 3.34 ERA and 36 strikeouts in 35 innings. In November 2016, Leone was designated for assignment by the Diamondbacks.

=== Toronto Blue Jays ===
On November 18, 2016, Leone was claimed off waivers by the Toronto Blue Jays. Though initially sent by the Blue Jays to their minor league camp late in spring training, Leone was recalled on April 2 to start the 2017 season with the major league club, taking the roster spot of the injured closer Roberto Osuna. He was optioned to the Triple-A Buffalo Bisons on May 30 but was recalled again on June 6. Leone was placed on the bereavement list for undisclosed reasons on August 13, and activated on August 16. On September 11, Leone earned his first major league save when he pitched a scoreless 9th inning in a 4–3 victory against the Baltimore Orioles. Leone would finish his first season as a Blue Jay appearing in 65 games, posting a 2.56 ERA, and striking out 81 batters over 70 1/3 innings.

Leone qualified for super two status during the 2017-18 offseason and signed a one-year, $1.085 million contract for the 2018 season on January 12, 2018.

=== St. Louis Cardinals ===
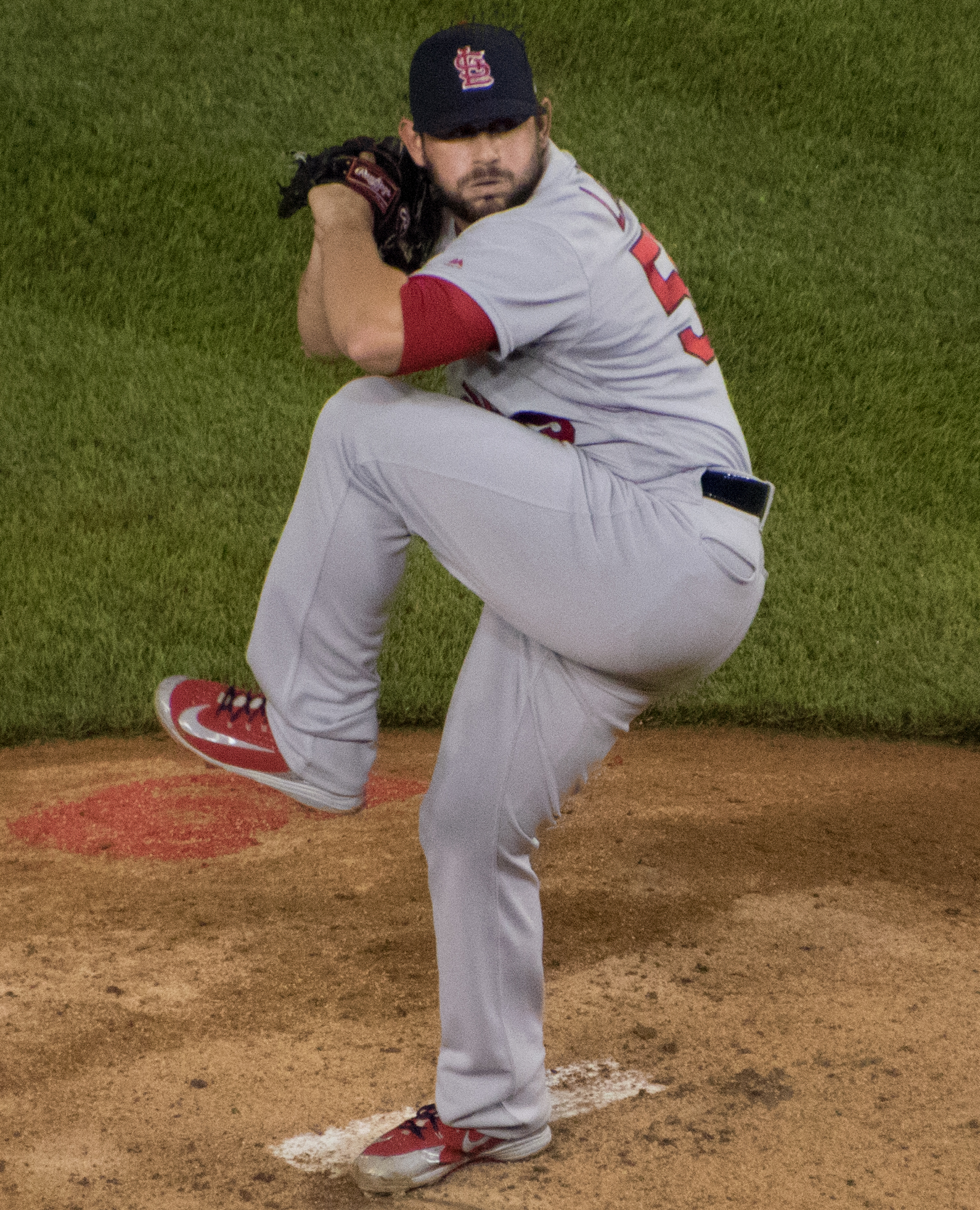
Leone with the Cardinals in 2019

On January 19, 2018, the Blue Jays traded Leone and Conner Greene to the St. Louis Cardinals for outfielder Randal Grichuk. On May 9, he was placed on the 10-day disabled list with nerve damage in his right arm, and on May 30, he was transferred to the 60-day disabled list. In 13 innings pitched prior to his injury, he compiled a 4.15 ERA with 15 strikeouts. He was activated from the disabled list on August 26. Leone finished his first season in St. Louis with a 1–2 record and a 4.50 ERA in 29 relief appearances.

Leone began 2019 in St. Louis' bullpen, but was sent down to the Memphis Redbirds in May after pitching to an 8.02 ERA in 21 1/3 innings. He was recalled to St. Louis on June 25, but optioned again on July 21. He was recalled once again on August 22, finishing the season in St. Louis. Over 40 2/3 relief innings pitched during the regular season with the Cardinals, Leone went 1–0 with a 5.53 ERA, striking out 46. Leone was designated for assignment on November 20, 2019. He was released on November 25.

=== Cleveland Indians ===
On January 23, 2020, Leone signed a minor league deal with the Cleveland Indians. The Indians selected his contract on July 23. Leone was designated for assignment by the Indians on September 11. He had an 8.38 ERA over 9.2 innings pitched in 12 games for the Indians. After clearing waivers, Leone was outrighted to the Indians' alternate training site roster on September 13. He elected free agency on October 14.

=== San Francisco Giants ===
On December 8, 2020, Leone signed a minor league contract with the San Francisco Giants organization. On June 1, 2021, he was selected to the active roster. On October 3, Leone struck out Eric Hosmer of the San Diego Padres to end the last game of the season and clinch the National League West division championship for the Giants. In 2021, Leone was 4–5 with 2 saves and a career-best 1.51 ERA. He pitched in 57 games (4 starts), covering 53 2/3 innings in which he allowed 6.2 hits per nine innings.

In 2022, Leone made 55 appearances for San Francisco, posting a 4–5 record (identical to his 2021 record) and 4.01 ERA with 52 strikeouts and three saves in 49 1/3 innings pitched. On September 10, Leone was placed on unconditional release waivers.

=== Texas Rangers ===
On February 18, 2023, Leone signed a minor league contract with the Texas Rangers organization. Leone was released by the organization on March 24. Leone re-signed with the Rangers on a new minor league contract on March 29. He made 8 appearances for the Triple-A Round Rock Express, working to a pristine 1.59 ERA and 2–0 record with 15 strikeouts and 2 saves in 11 1/3 innings pitched. On May 2, Leone opted out of his minor league contract and became a free agent.

=== New York Mets ===
On May 4, 2023, Leone signed a one-year, major league contract with the New York Mets. Hours after signing with the Mets, Leone's first game back was against the Detroit Tigers where he pitched in relief for one inning. He faced three batters and had one strikeout.

=== Los Angeles Angels ===
On August 1, 2023, Leone was traded to the Los Angeles Angels in exchange for Jeremiah Jackson. After posting a 5.54 ERA in 11 relief appearances, Leone was placed on waivers by the Angels on August 29.

=== Seattle Mariners (second stint) ===
On August 31, 2023, Leone was claimed off waivers by the Seattle Mariners. In 9 appearances for the Mariners, he registered a 4.35 ERA with 10 strikeouts across 10 1/3 innings of work.

=== Chicago White Sox ===
On February 13, 2024, Leone signed a minor league contract with the Chicago White Sox. On March 27, the White Sox selected Leone's contract after he made the team's Opening Day roster. After struggling to a 7.04 ERA in 18 games, he was placed on the injured list with right elbow inflammation on May 24. Leone was transferred to the 60–day injured list on June 11. He was activated on August 5. After five more games for Chicago, Leone was placed back on the 60-day injured list with a UCL sprain on August 16, ending his season.

On October 26, 2024, Leone announced his retirement from professional baseball via Instagram.

== Personal life ==
Leone and his wife were married in December 2016.
