= Jon Harris (baseball) =

American baseball player (born 1993)

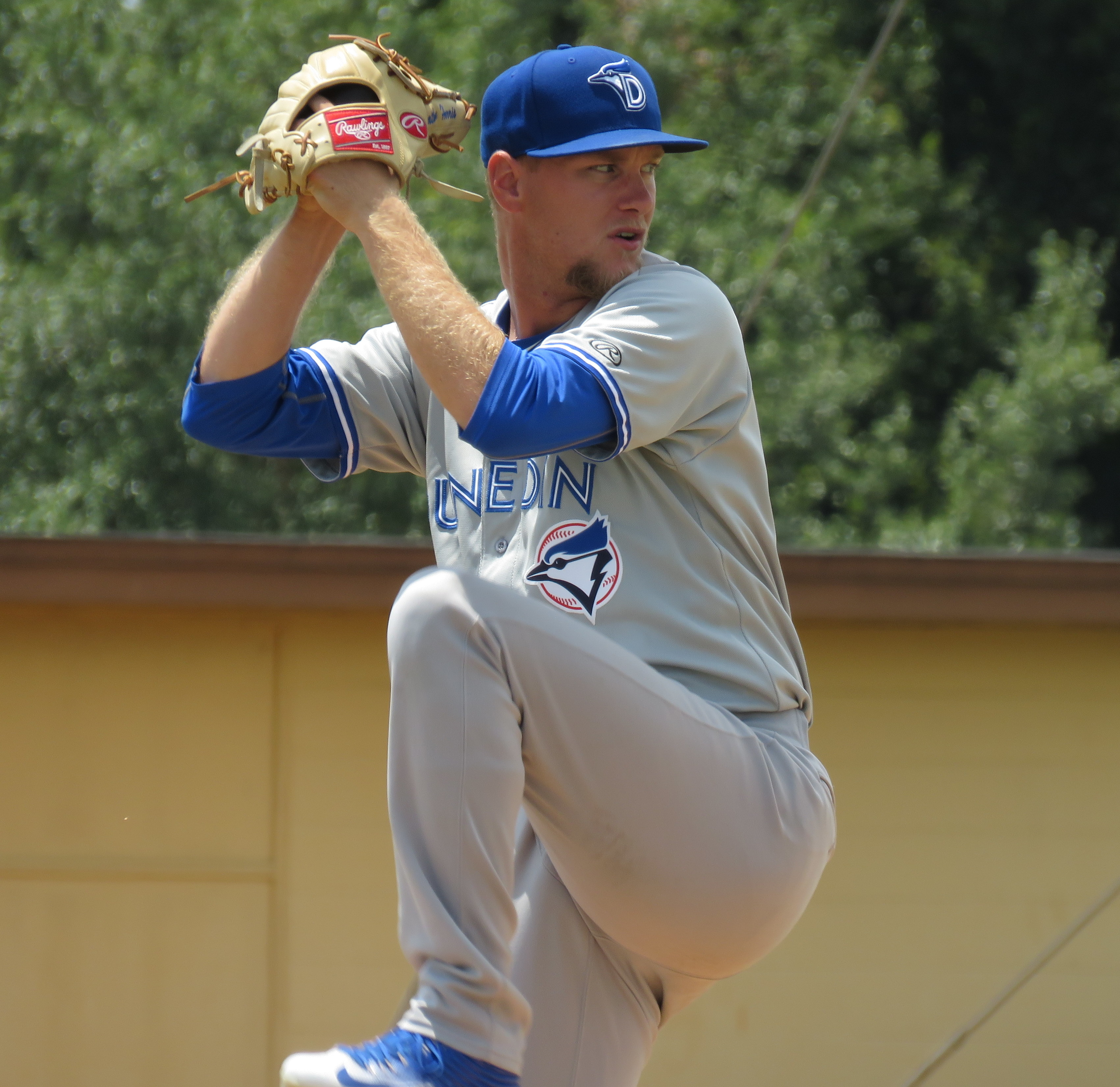
- Harris with the Dunedin Blue Jays in 2016
- Pitcher
- Born: October 16, 1993 (age 32); St. Louis, Missouri, U.S.
- Bats: Right Throws: Right
- Stats at Baseball Reference

Jonathan Richard Harris (born October 16, 1993) is an American former professional baseball pitcher. He played college baseball at Missouri State University, and was drafted by the Toronto Blue Jays in the first round of the 2015 Major League Baseball draft.

== High school and college ==
Harris attended Hazelwood Central High School in St. Louis, Missouri. He was drafted by the Toronto Blue Jays in the 33rd round of the 2012 Major League Baseball draft but did not sign and played college baseball at Missouri State University. As a freshman in 2013, Harris started 13 games going 8–2 with a 3.87 earned run average (ERA) and 61 strikeouts. As a sophomore, he appeared in 15 games with 11 starts. He went 3–5 with a 3.16 ERA, 66 strikeouts and two saves. After the 2014 season, he played collegiate summer baseball with the Harwich Mariners of the Cape Cod Baseball League. As a junior at MSU, he went 8–2 with a 2.45 ERA with 116 strikeouts in 15 starts.

== Professional career ==
=== Toronto Blue Jays ===
Harris was considered one of the top prospects for the 2015 Major League Baseball draft. The Toronto Blue Jays selected Harris in the first round, with the 29th overall selection, of the draft. He signed with Toronto on June 15, 2015. Harris played the entire 2015 season with the Low-A Vancouver Canadians, where he posted a 6.75 ERA and 32 strikeouts in 36 innings pitched. He was assigned to the Single-A Lansing Lugnuts to open the 2016 minor league season. Harris was named an Eastern Division All-Star for Lansing on June 7. He made 16 starts for Lansing, posting an 8–2 record, 2.23 ERA, and 73 strikeouts in 84 2/3 innings before being promoted to the High-A Dunedin Blue Jays in mid July. Harris would make eight starts for Dunedin, and pitch to a 3–2 win–loss record, 3.60 ERA, and 26 strikeouts in 45 innings.

Harris played the entire 2017 minor league season for the Double-A New Hampshire Fisher Cats. He made 26 starts and posted a 7–11 record, 5.41 ERA, and 113 strikeouts in 143 innings pitched. On January 24, 2018, the Blue Jays invited Harris to spring training. Harris did not make the team and split the year between the Triple-A Buffalo Bisons and New Hampshire, posting a 13–6 record and 4.61 ERA in 27 games.

Harris split the 2019 season between New Hampshire, Dunedin, and the rookie-level Gulf Coast League Blue Jays, but played in only 6 games due to injury. Harris did not play in a game in 2020 due to the cancellation of the minor league season because of the COVID-19 pandemic. On July 29, 2021, Harris was promoted by the Blue Jays to Triple-A Buffalo, but only played in 2 games for the team. He spent the majority of the 2021 season with Double-A New Hampshire, logging a 2.93 ERA with 34 strikeouts in 28 appearances. He became a free agent following the season on November 7, 2021.

=== Kansas City Monarchs ===
On January 18, 2022, Harris signed with the Kansas City Monarchs of the American Association of Professional Baseball. He made 14 starts for the team, recording a 4–2 record and 4.92 ERA with 58 strikeouts in 75 innings of work. Harris was released by the Monarchs following the season on December 22.
