= Mark Trumbo =

American baseball player (born 1986)

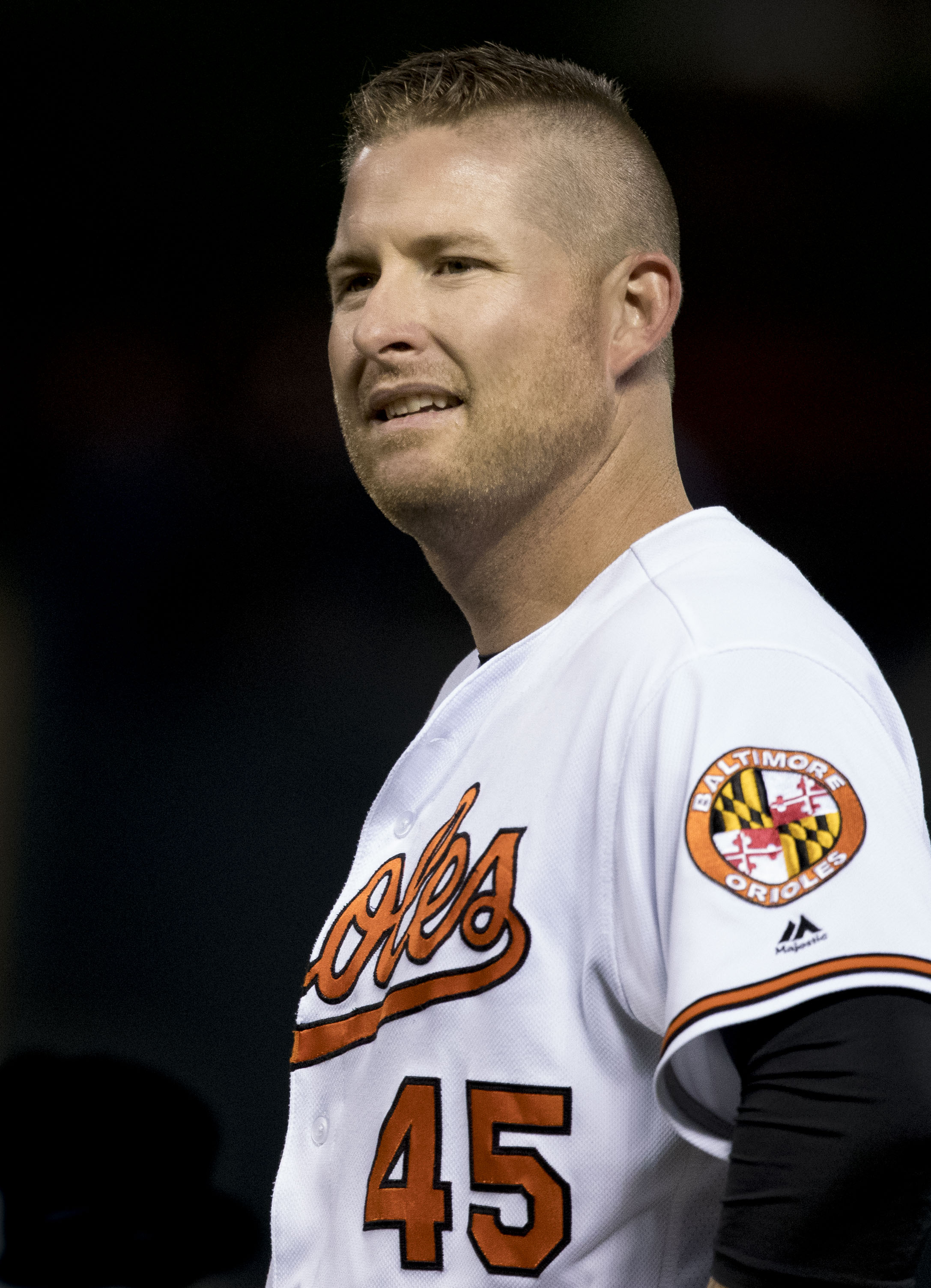
- Trumbo with the Baltimore Orioles in 2016
- Outfielder / First baseman / Designated hitter
- Born: January 16, 1986 (age 40); Anaheim, California, U.S.
- Batted: Right Threw: Right

MLB debut
- September 11, 2010, for the Los Angeles Angels of Anaheim

Last MLB appearance
- September 29, 2019, for the Baltimore Orioles

MLB statistics
- Batting average: .249
- Home runs: 218
- Runs batted in: 629
- Stats at Baseball Reference

Teams
- Los Angeles Angels of Anaheim (2010–2013); Arizona Diamondbacks (2014–2015); Seattle Mariners (2015); Baltimore Orioles (2016–2019)

Career highlights and awards
- 2× All-Star (2012, 2016); Silver Slugger Award (2016); MLB home run leader (2016)

Mark Daniel Trumbo (born January 16, 1986) is an American former professional baseball outfielder and first baseman. He played in Major League Baseball (MLB) for the Los Angeles Angels of Anaheim, Arizona Diamondbacks, Seattle Mariners, and Baltimore Orioles. Trumbo was an All-Star in 2012 and 2016.

== Amateur career ==
Trumbo was born in Anaheim, California, and played high school baseball at Villa Park High School in Villa Park, California. Growing up, Trumbo played travel baseball against future major leaguers Phil Hughes and Brandon Barnes. At Villa Park, Trumbo was a pitcher and infielder, and was a 2005 High School All-American after hitting .425 and going 10–2 with a 2.20 ERA on the mound.

== Professional career ==
=== Los Angeles Angels of Anaheim ===
Trumbo was selected by the Anaheim Angels in the 18th round (533rd overall) of the 2004 Major League Baseball draft. He was promoted to the major leagues as part of the September roster expansions on September 3, 2010. He made his major league debut on September 11, 2010, as a pinch hitter for Mike Napoli and then remained in the game to play first base.

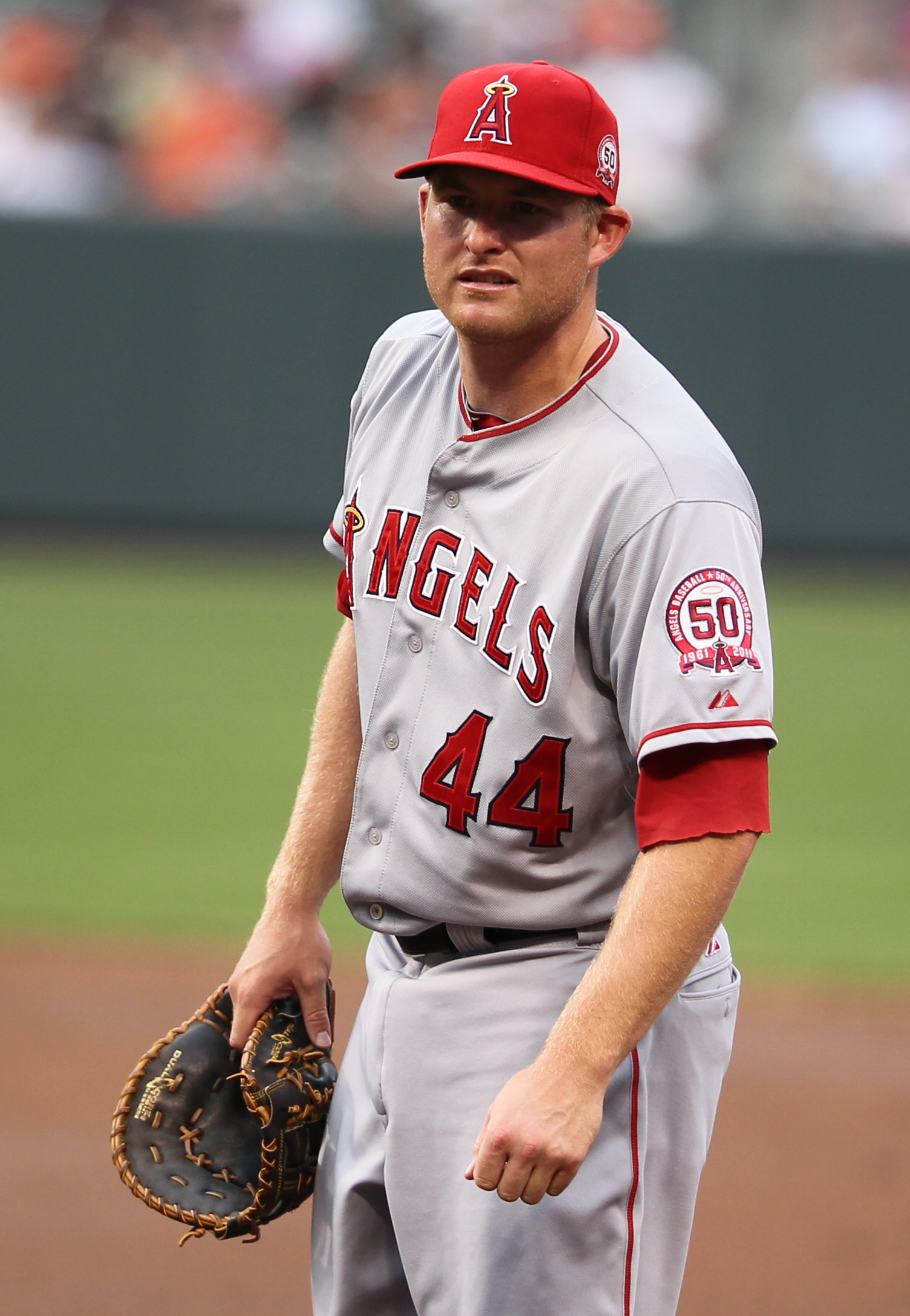
Trumbo playing for the Los Angeles Angels of Anaheim in 2011

Trumbo entered the 2011 season looking for some early-season playing time at first base after a spring in which he displayed his over credited power. Trumbo hit his first career home run on April 12, 2011, off Fausto Carmona of the Cleveland Indians. Although he planned to be a first baseman only until Kendrys Morales' returned from injury. He became the Angels' full-time first baseman for the 2011 season due to Morales' season-ending surgery. He led all rookies with 29 home runs and 87 RBIs while batting .254 in his rookie campaign, but finished second in Rookie of the Year voting to Jeremy Hellickson of the Tampa Bay Rays. Trumbo also led the American League in putouts with 1,284 in 2011.

The Angels acquired Albert Pujols on December 8, 2011, which forced Trumbo to change positions. In the early stages of the 2012 season Trumbo and Alberto Callaspo shared time at third base; Trumbo also started games in left and right field as well as designated hitter.

On June 10, 2012, Trumbo had a career-high six RBIs on two three-run home runs in a game against the Colorado Rockies. Trumbo was selected for the 2012 Home Run Derby by AL captain Robinson Cano, advancing to the second round before being ousted in a playoff by José Bautista. Trumbo was elected to his first all-star game, which was the 2012 Major League Baseball All-Star Game, in his sophomore season.

In 2013, he batted .234/.294/.453 in 620 at bats.

=== Arizona Diamondbacks ===
The Angels traded Trumbo to the Arizona Diamondbacks in a three-team trade also involving the Chicago White Sox. The Angels received Tyler Skaggs and Hector Santiago, while the White Sox received Adam Eaton and the Diamondbacks also received A. J. Schugel and Brandon Jacobs. On April 6, Trumbo hit his 100th career home run against the Rockies. On April 24, Trumbo was placed on the 15-day disabled list with a stress fracture in his left foot. He was removed from the disabled list on July 7. In 2014, he batted .235/.293/.415 in 328 at bats.

=== Seattle Mariners ===
On June 3, 2015, the Diamondbacks traded Trumbo and Vidal Nuño to the Seattle Mariners for catcher Welington Castillo, reliever Dominic Leone, and prospects Gabby Guerrero and Jack Reinheimer.

Trumbo played in 96 games for the Mariners and slashed .263/.316/.419 while hitting 13 home runs, 13 doubles, and driving in 41 runs.

=== Baltimore Orioles ===
==== 2016 ====
On December 2, 2015, the Mariners traded Trumbo and C. J. Riefenhauser to the Baltimore Orioles for Steve Clevenger. Trumbo went 4-for-5 in the first game of the 2016 season, his sixth career game with four hits.

Trumbo hit his first home run in an Orioles uniform on April 11. He homered again the next day. Trumbo homered for the third time in four games on April 14, and on April 15, Trumbo became the first Oriole to hit two home runs in the same inning, driving in a total of five runs in the Orioles 11-5 comeback victory over the Rangers. It was Trumbo's eighth career multi-homer game.

Through his first ten games, Trumbo hit .400, five home runs, and had 11 RBIs. Trumbo was later named AL co-Player of the week after slashing .320/.346/.960, hitting five home runs, driving in 11 runs, and scoring eight times. For the month of April, Trumbo slashed .337/.385/.573 with a .958 OPS, six home runs, 19 RBIs, and three doubles.

Trumbo collected his ninth career multi-homer game on May 3 in a 4–1 victory over the Yankees. On May 11, Trumbo had his tenth career multi-homer game. Trumbo finished May with a slash line of .239/.291/.550. Despite the low average, he hit nine home runs in the month and collected 18 RBIs. He also added five doubles and a triple. In a 12–7 victory over the Red Sox on June 2, Trumbo and the Orioles blasted a season-high seven home runs, two of which belonged to Trumbo. Trumbo had a strong June, as he slashed .281/.328/.553 while blasting eight home runs and driving in 23 runs. He was later selected to participate in the Home Run Derby and was selected to his second career All-Star Game. In the derby, Trumbo hit 16 home runs in the first round and 14 in the second, eventually losing to the Derby champion Giancarlo Stanton.

On August 18, Trumbo set a new career high in home runs, 35, against the Houston Astros. On August 22, Trumbo hit a go-ahead 2-run home run against the Washington Nationals. With the home run, he collected his 500th career RBI. The home run was also his seventh consecutive hit being a home run. On August 28, Trumbo hit his 40th home run of the season. He became the fifth-fastest Oriole to hit their 40th home run in a season (Chris Davis, Jim Gentile, Brady Anderson & Frank Robinson). On September 18, Trumbo set a new career high in RBIs, with 101, by hitting his 43rd home run of the year against the Tampa Bay Rays. Trumbo hit his league-leading 44th home run of the year on September 23 in a 3-2 walk-off victory over the Diamondbacks. It was the fifth walk-off home run of his career.

Trumbo ended the year having played in 159 games, slashing .256/.316/.533 while hitting a Major League-leading 47 home runs and driving in 108 RBIs, while seeing the lowest percentage of fastballs of all MLB hitters (47.5%). Trumbo tied a career-high in games played and on-base percentage, while setting career-highs in runs scored, hits, home runs, RBIs, slugging percentage and OPS. His 47 home runs tied him for fourth most home runs in a single season in Orioles franchise history, tied with teammate Chris Davis. The Orioles finished the season 89–73, qualifying for the final postseason spot. In the Wild Card game, Trumbo hit a fourth inning 2-run home run to give the Orioles an early 2–1 lead. The Orioles lost 5–2 in 11 innings.

Trumbo won the AL Sporting News Comeback Player of the Year Award for his accomplishments during the 2016 season. He also won the Silver Slugger Award, the first of his career.

==== 2017 ====
On January 20, 2017, Trumbo signed a three-year contract with the Orioles. On Opening Day, Trumbo hit a walk-off home run for the Orioles, against the Blue Jays, in the eleventh inning. He finished the game with two hits, a double, a home run and two RBIs. The blast was Trumbo's sixth career walk-off homer.

On September 5, 2017, Trumbo hit his 200th career home run off of CC Sabathia. In 2017, he batted .234/.289/.397 in 559 at bats. He had four walk-off hits during the season, the most in MLB.

==== 2018 ====
Trumbo began the season on the disabled list, missing the first month of the season. He was activated on May 1. Trumbo had season ending knee surgery in August. He finished the year with a .261 batting average along with 17 home runs and 44 RBIs in 358 plate appearances. He played only 90 games due to injuries.

==== 2019 ====
After spending most of the 2019 season on the injured list following his knee surgery, Trumbo was activated off the IL on September 2, 2019. He played in only 12 games, hitting .172 in 29 at bats.

== Post-playing career ==
In March 2022, Trumbo was invited by Baltimore Orioles director of administration Kevin Buck to serve as a special instructor during Spring Training.

== Personal life ==
Trumbo and his family reside in Newport Beach CA.

Trumbo is close friends with Thrice drummer Riley Breckenridge. Trumbo has used Thrice's songs "Firebreather" and "Black Honey" as walkup music.
