= Travis Swaggerty =

American baseball player (born 1997)

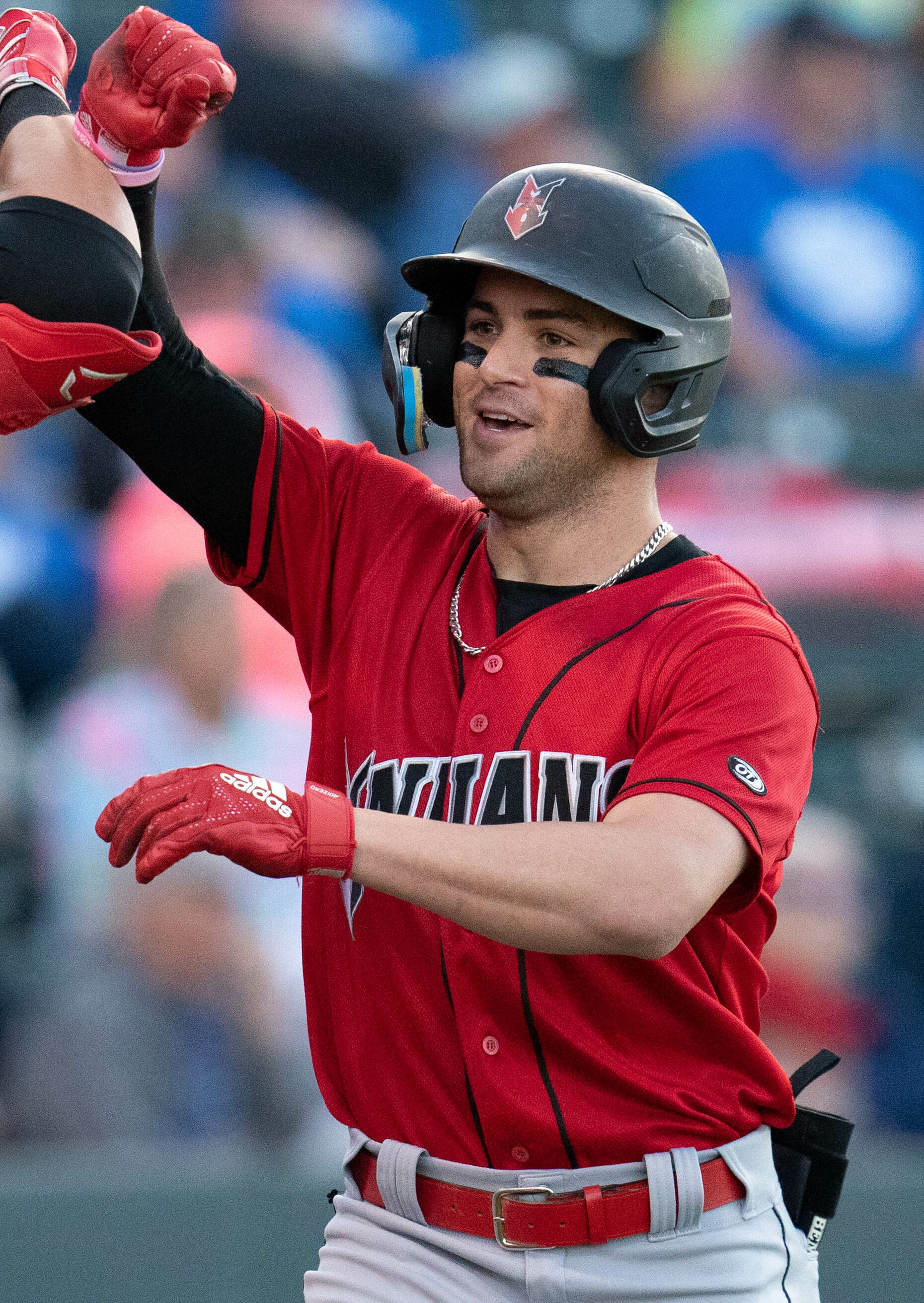
- Swaggerty with the Indianapolis Indians in 2022

Free agent
- Outfielder
- Born: August 19, 1997 (age 29); Covington, Louisiana, U.S.
- Bats: Left Throws: Left

MLB debut
- June 7, 2022, for the Pittsburgh Pirates

MLB statistics (through 2022 season)
- Batting average: .111
- Home runs: 0
- Runs batted in: 0
- Stats at Baseball Reference

Teams
- Pittsburgh Pirates (2022)

Travis Wade Swaggerty Jr. (born August 19, 1997) is an American professional baseball outfielder who is a free agent. He has previously played in Major League Baseball (MLB) for the Pittsburgh Pirates.

== Amateur career ==
Swaggerty attended Denham Springs High School in Denham Springs, Louisiana, and played on their baseball team. As a senior, he batted .451 and was named to the Louisiana Sports Writers Association's Class 5A All State team. He was not drafted in the 2015 Major League Baseball draft and enrolled at the University of South Alabama where he played college baseball.

As a freshman in 2016 at South Alabama, Swaggerty appeared in 59 games, compiling a .303 batting average with four home runs, 27 RBIs, 12 doubles and 20 stolen bases. In 2017, as a sophomore, he appeared in and started 58 games, slashing .356/.484/.571 with 11 home runs, 60 RBIs, and 19 stolen bases. After the season, was named to the All-Sun Belt First Team. That summer, Swaggerty played for the USA Baseball Collegiate National Team where he batted .328/.449/.406 in 19 games, and also briefly played collegiate summer baseball with the Brewster Whitecaps of the Cape Cod Baseball League. He was named a first-team preseason All-American by Baseball America, D1Baseball.com, and Perfect Game prior to his junior season along with being named the 2018 Sun Belt Preseason Player of the Year. He finished his junior season batting .296 with 13 home runs, 38 RBIs, and a .455 on-base percentage over 57 games. He was named to the All-Sun Belt First Team for the second year in a row.

== Professional career ==
=== Pittsburgh Pirates ===
The Pittsburgh Pirates selected Swaggerty in the first round, with the tenth overall selection, of the 2018 Major League Baseball draft. He signed for $4.4 million and was assigned to the West Virginia Black Bears of the Low-A New York–Penn League, with whom he was named an All-Star. After hitting .288 with four home runs and 15 RBIs in 36 games for the Black Bears, he was promoted to the West Virginia Power of the Single-A South Atlantic League in August. He finished the season with the Power, batting .129 with one home run and five RBIs in 16 games. Swaggerty spent 2019 with the Bradenton Marauders of the High-A Florida State League and was named an All-Star. Over 121 games, he slashed .265/.347/.381 with nine home runs, forty RBIs, and 23 stolen bases. He did not play a minor league game in 2020 after the season was cancelled due to the COVID-19 pandemic.

To begin the 2021 season, Swaggerty was assigned to the Indianapolis Indians of the Triple-A East. On May 27, he was placed on the 60-day injured list after dislocating his right shoulder. He later had season-ending surgery. Over 41 at-bats prior to the injury, he hit .220 with three home runs and seven RBIs. On November 19, 2021, the Pirates selected Swaggerty's contract and added him to their 40-man roster. He returned to the Indians to begin the 2022 season. In early May, he was placed on the injured list with a concussion but was activated just a week later.

On June 4, 2022, the Pirates promoted Swaggerty to the major leagues. At the time of his promotion, he was batting .280 with four home runs, 22 RBIs, and two triples over 35 games. He started in center field in a game against the Detroit Tigers on June 7, making his MLB debut. Swaggerty recorded his first major league hit against Atlanta Braves pitcher Max Fried on June 9. He was optioned back to Indianapolis on June 13.

Swaggerty was optioned to Triple-A Indianapolis to begin the 2023 season. In 17 games, he hit .200/.278/.369 with one home run, five RBI, and three stolen bases. He spent time on the injured list due to recurrent migraines, which he began experiencing in November 2022. On July 17, Swaggerty was designated for assignment by the Pirates. He was released by the team on July 19.

=== Chicago White Sox ===
On August 13, 2023, Swaggerty signed a minor league contract with the Chicago White Sox. He was released on October 10, without having appeared in a game for the organization.

=== Kansas City Monarchs ===
On December 11, 2023, Swaggerty signed a minor league contract with the Los Angeles Dodgers. After failing to make the club in spring training, Swaggerty was released on March 28, 2024.

On April 30, 2024, Swaggerty signed with the Kansas City Monarchs of the American Association of Professional Baseball. In 73 games for the Monarchs, he batted .269/.378/.422 with seven home runs, 41 RBI, and 20 stolen bases.

=== New York Mets ===
On December 20, 2024, Swaggerty signed a minor league contract with the New York Mets. In 34 appearances split between the Double-A Binghamton Rumble Ponies and Triple-A Syracuse Mets, he hit a combined .207/.307/.276 with eight RBI and two stolen bases. Swaggerty was released by the Mets organization on July 2, 2025.

=== El Águila de Veracruz ===
On March 5, 2026, Swaggerty signed with the El Águila de Veracruz of the Mexican League. He was released prior to the start of the season.

== Personal life ==
During Swaggerty's junior year at the University of South Alabama, his partner Peyton transferred to the school. Shortly after he was drafted, she was diagnosed with and treated for thyroid cancer. The couple married in December 2020 and they welcomed their first child, a daughter, in September 2021.
