= Kansas City Monarchs (American Association) =

Professional baseball team in Kansas City

- Founded in 1993 in Duluth, Minnesota; Based in Kansas City, Kansas since 2003

Minor league affiliations
- League: American Association of Professional Baseball (2011–present)
- Division: West Division
- Previous leagues: Northern League (1993–2010)

Minor league titles
- League titles (5): 2008; 2018; 2021; 2023; 2026
- Division titles (5): 2019; 2021; 2022; 2023; 2026

Team data
- Name: Kansas City Monarchs (2021–present)
- Previous names: Kansas City T-Bones (2003–2020); Duluth–Superior Dukes (1993–2002)
- Colors: Navy, red, cream
- Ballpark: Legends Field
- Previous parks: Wade Stadium (1993–2002)
- Owner/ Operator: Mark Brandmeyer / Max Fun LLC
- General manager: Jay Hinrichs
- Manager: Joe Calfapietra
- Media: Kansas City Kansan, The Kansas City Star
- Website: monarchsbaseball.com

The Kansas City Monarchs are a professional baseball team based in Kansas City, Kansas. Formerly known as the Kansas City T-Bones, they are members of the American Association of Professional Baseball, which, in 2020, became designated as a Major League Baseball partner league. They have played their home games at Legends Field (formerly CommunityAmerica Ballpark) since 2003, when the team began as a member of the Northern League. In 2011, the team joined the modern American Association. In 2018, the T-Bones won their first-ever American Association championship by defeating the St. Paul Saints. While named the T-Bones, the team's mascot was named Sizzle. On January 21, 2021, the team announced a partnership with the Negro Leagues Baseball Museum and a rebranding to the Kansas City Monarchs, one of the founding teams of the Negro National League.

The Monarchs defeated the Fargo-Moorhead RedHawks in the 2021 American Association championship, claiming the franchise's third title. They then added a fourth championship in 2023, defeating the Chicago Dogs.

== History ==
The team was founded in 1993 as the Duluth–Superior Dukes (representing Duluth, Minnesota, and Superior, Wisconsin), a charter member of the Northern League. The Dukes were mostly unsuccessful in their history, but won the Northern League championship in 1997, though league records do not reflect such continuity.

=== Northern League (2003–2010) ===
The T-Bones broke ground on the park now known as Legends Field on September 4, 2002, and played their first home game on June 6, 2003, just over nine months later. In their inaugural season, the team finished 43–46, but enjoyed a banner season from Eddie Pearson, who led the league in batting average (.362), RBIs (78), and hits (124) and was named 2003 Northern League Most Valuable Player.

The T-Bones finished the 2004 regular season with a 48–48 record. However, the T-Bones won the second-half South Division title and faced the Schaumburg Flyers in the first round of the playoffs. The T-Bones lost the best-of-five series 3–2. For the year, T-Bones player Eddie Pearson received the Most Valuable Player Award, Rick Muntean received Co-Executive of the Year, and the team received Organization of the Year. Several league records were set by T-Bones players: Jonathan Krysa set records for innings pitched (165 1/3), total batters faced, and games started (24); Rick Prieto set new records for walks (78) and runs (97) while tying the league record for triples (10); and Eddie Pearson set the intentional walks record with 17.

The T-Bones accumulated a 45–49 record in 2005. They finished second in the first half with a record of 27–19, just missing the playoff berth, but never contended in the second half due to the loss of several key players.

In 2006, Jonathan Krysa, a failed 26th round Houston Astros draft pick who lasted only a couple seasons in the minor leagues, was named Northern League Pitcher of the Year with a record of 13–5 and a 3.74 ERA. The T-Bones finished third in both halves of the season. They led the second-half race until the final week, when a disastrous season-ending road trip ended their hopes. On October 16, the T-Bones announced the firing of manager, "Dirty" Al Gallagher, who had been the team's first and only manager. He was replaced by Andy McCauley.

During the 2006 campaign, the team hosted the Northern League All-Star Game on July 18 in front of 5,975 fans. Eight T-Bones were selected to the East Division squad, which won the game 7–6, scoring two runs in the bottom of the ninth. Kansas City closer Byron Embry earned the win and T-Bones infielder Chad Sosebee drove in the winning run. The highlight of the night, though, was the appearance of 94-year-old Buck O'Neil, a former Kansas City Monarchs star who took one at-bat for each side, drawing walks each time. He became the oldest person to ever appear in a professional baseball game.

The team hired former Schaumburg manager Andy McCauley to replace Gallagher in 2007. They began the season with only two players carried over from the previous year, and released them by mid-season for a complete turnover of its 22-man roster. The T-Bones finished deep in last place in the Southern Division in the first half, but moved into the lead during the second half and held that lead until a late-season collapse left them in second-place finish. The team's overall 44–52 record was one game worse than the previous season's franchise record. Despite their finish, the organization was named Northern League Organization of the Year.

In 2008, the Northern League contracted to six teams, and a single-division full season schedule was used. The T-Bones finished only marginally better (46–50) than the two previous seasons, but nonetheless qualified as the fourth team in the playoffs. They swept the Fargo-Moorhead RedHawks in the best-of-five semifinal round of the playoffs and then defeated the Gary SouthShore RailCats three games to one to win the Northern League championship.

The T-Bones matched their previous season's record (46–50) and finish (fourth in a six-team league) in 2009, but could not advance past the first round, losing that series 3–2 to Gary. Shortly after the end of the season, the team announced that hitting coach Tim Doherty had been promoted to manager for the following season, replacing Andy McCauley.

The Northern League expanded to eight teams again for 2010, but maintained the same playoff format, allowing the top four finishers into the postseason. The T-Bones enjoyed their most successful season under new manager Tim Doherty, winning 58 games and setting a new league record with 162 home runs, exceeding the previous high by more than 30%. They led through much of the year, but faded in the stretch to finish in second place, three games behind Fargo-Moorhead. T-Bones second baseman Jason Blackwood led the Northern League in home runs (31), RBI (86), runs scored (82), hits (141), total bases (271), and slugging percentage (.636) while finishing third in batting average (.331), and was named 2010 Northern League Player of the Year. The team beat the Joliet Jackhammers three games to two in the first round of the playoffs, but were swept in three games by Fargo-Moorhead in the finals. The T-Bones were named Northern League Organization of the Year for the second time in four seasons, and CommunityAmerica Ballpark was named "Northern League Playing Surface of the Year" for the second-straight season.

=== American Association (2011–present) ===
On October 13, 2010, the T-Bones left the Northern League, along with the Fargo-Moorhead RedHawks, Gary SouthShore RailCats, and the Winnipeg Goldeyes to join the American Association (AA) for the 2011 season. The team fell out of the race early and finished fifth (last) in their division, though their 48–52 record was better than any third-place finisher in the other two divisions. Outfielder Ray Sadler was the offensive leader, hitting .315 with 22 HR (second in the AA) and a league-leading 100 RBI. Outfielder Keanon Simon led the team with a .332 average and tied for the league lead with 16 triples, while catcher Kala Kaaihue tied Sadler with 22 homeruns. Kris Johnson finished third in the AA with a 3.23 ERA.

The T-Bones, in their second year in the American Association, finished second in their division with a 51–49 record, but did not qualify for the 2012 playoffs. This was the first season for the T-Bones under Kenny Hook. The 2013 T-Bones finished in third in their division with a 40–60 record, posting the worst record in franchise history. After the season, manager Kenny Hook's contract was not renewed. In 2014, Kansas City's record improved to 48–52 under first-year manager John Massarelli, finishing third in the Central Division. The 2015 T-Bones were left in a distant second place with a 49–50 record, 26 1/2 games behind Sioux City. In a tight 2016 Central Division that saw the top three teams finish two games apart, the T-Bones were the lone team left out of the division race, finishing in last place with a 42–58 record. Despite this, second baseman Brett Wiley was named a postseason American Association All-Star. John Massarelli did not return as manager after this season.

Before the 2017 season, the T-Bones hired longtime Can-Am League manager Joe Calfapietra. The move paid immediate dividends as the T-Bones posted their best season since moving to the AA, finishing 57–43, tying the Gary SouthShore RailCats and Fargo-Moorhead RedHawks for the American Association wild card slot. The RailCats, however earned the playoff spot on a tiebreaker. Closer Cody Winiarski was named American Association Reliever of the Year.

In 2018, the T-Bones posted their best season in franchise history, going 62–37. They finished 8 1/2 games behind Sioux City, but ended 1 1/2 games ahead of Wichita, securing their first playoff berth since moving to the American Association. They ousted Sioux City in five games, moving on to face St. Paul in the American Association finals, where the T-Bones prevailed in four games for their first AA crown and second league title in franchise history. Pitcher Tommy Collier led the league with 12 wins and 140 strikeouts, while Todd Cunningham was named an American Association Postseason All-Star. Joe Calfapietra earned the Manager of the Year Award.

After trailing by ten games in late July 2019, the T-Bones rallied to capture their first division title, winning the South Division with a 58–42 record, one game ahead of both Sioux City and the Cleburne Railroaders. In the playoffs, Sioux City eliminated Kansas City in four games.

Following years of sliding attendance and mounting debt, the Unified Government of Wyandotte County/Kansas City, Kansas evicted the T-Bones from T-Bones Stadium on October 14, 2019, for failure to pay nearly US$700,000 of rent and utility payments. Days later, the Unified Government approved a stadium lease with an organization trying to purchase the T-Bones. The purchase was completed, and the new five-year lease has three five-year options.

In 2020, the league announced that the T-Bones were not selected as one of six teams to participate in a condensed season as a result of the COVID-19 pandemic. They went on hiatus for the season, with plans to return in 2021. The T-Bones partnered with the Unified Government and the Kansas City Royals, the Major League Baseball franchise across the river in neighboring Kansas City, Missouri, to host a group of Royals players and coaches at T-Bones Stadium as the club's "alternate training site" for summer training.

==== Kansas City Monarchs ====
Kansas City won the 2021 American Association championship, going a perfect 6–0 in the postseason and sweeping the Fargo-Moorhead RedHawks in the best-of-five Finals. The season was highlighted by posting a league-best and franchise-record 69 wins, as well as setting AA records with 149 homers and 664 runs scored. Infielder Ryan Grotjohn and Outfielder Gabriel Guerrero both earned postseason All-Star nods, Joe Calfapietra earned the Manager of the Year nod, and Guerrero was Finals MVP.

The 2022 campaign saw the American Association shuffle divisional alignments from north–south to east–west. Nonetheless, the Monarchs earned a third straight division title with a league-best 65–35 record to take the West crown, only to succumb in the semifinals to eventual champion Fargo-Moorhead. Starting pitcher Matt Hall earned AA Starting Pitcher of the Year honors after posting a league-record 1.10 ERA while the club shattered their own year-old league records by scoring 696 runs and blasting 165 home runs, while also setting league records in slugging percentage (.505), walks (478), grand slams (8), and total bases (1,767).

In 2023, the Monarchs once more took the West with a league-best 59–40 record before going 7-2 through the playoffs, dispatching the Chicago Dogs in four games to win the best-of-five Miles Wolff Cup series, matching the league record set by the Winnipeg Goldeyes with their third American Association title. Catcher Chris Herrmann earned Postseason All-Star honors and was named American Association Player of the Year after slashing .355/.439/.617 with 23 home runs and a league-high 88 RBI. Jan Hernandez took homer Finals MVP honors.

== Season-by-season records ==
			First Half		Second Half		Overall
Season	League	Division	W–L	Finish	W–L	Finish	W–L	Win%	Playoffs	Manager
2003	NL	West	20–25	4th	23–21	2nd	43–46	.483	Did not qualify	Al Gallagher
2004	NL	South	20–28	4th	28–20	1st	48–48	.500	Lost Semifinal 3–2 vs. Schaumburg	Al Gallagher
2005	NL	South	27–19	2nd	18–30	5th	45–49	.479	Did not qualify	Al Gallagher
2006	NL	South	22–26	3rd	23–25	3rd	45–51	.469	Did not qualify	Al Gallagher
2007	NL	South	18–30	4th	26–22	2nd	44–52	.458	Did not qualify	Andy McCauley
2008	NL	N/A	N/A	N/A	N/A	4th	46–50	.479	Won Semifinal 3–0 vs. Fargo-Moorhead Won Championship 3–1 vs. Gary SouthShore	Andy McCauley
2009	NL	N/A	N/A	N/A	N/A	4th	46–50	.479	Lost Semifinal 3–2 vs. Gary SouthShore	Andy McCauley
2010	NL	N/A	N/A	N/A	N/A	2nd	58–42	.580	Won Semifinal 3–2 vs. Joliet Lost Championship 3–0 vs. Fargo-Moorhead	Tim Doherty
2011	AA	Central	N/A	N/A	N/A	5th	48–52	.480	Did not qualify	Tim Doherty
2012	AA	Central	N/A	N/A	N/A	2nd	51–49	.510	Did not qualify	Ken Hook
2013	AA	Central	N/A	N/A	N/A	3rd	40–60	.400	Did not qualify	Ken Hook
2014	AA	Central	N/A	N/A	N/A	3rd	48–52	.480	Did not qualify	John Massarelli
2015	AA	Central	N/A	N/A	N/A	2nd	49–50	.495	Did not qualify	John Massarelli
2016	AA	Central	N/A	N/A	N/A	4th	42–58	.420	Did not qualify	John Massarelli
2017	AA	Central	N/A	N/A	N/A	3rd	57–43	.570	Did not qualify	Joe Calfapietra
2018	AA	South	N/A	N/A	N/A	2nd	62–37	.626	Won Semifinal 3–2 vs. Sioux City Won Finals 3–1 vs. St. Paul	Joe Calfapietra
2019	AA	South	N/A	N/A	N/A	1st	58–42	.580	Lost Semifinal 3–1 vs. Sioux City	Joe Calfapietra
2020	AA	On hiatus due to COVID-19
2021	AA	South	N/A	N/A	N/A	1st	69–31	.690	Won Semi-final 3–0 vs. Sioux City Won Finals 3–0 vs. Fargo-Moorhead	Joe Calfapietra
2022	AA	West	N/A	N/A	N/A	1st	65–35	.650	Won First Round 2-0 vs. Lincoln Lost Semifinal 2–1 vs. Fargo-Moorhead	Joe Calfapietra
2023	AA	West	N/A	N/A	N/A	1st	59-40	.596	Won First Round 2-0 vs. Sioux Falls Won Semifinal 2-1 vs. Sioux City Won Finals 3–1 vs. Chicago	Joe Calfapietra
NL							375–388	.490	13–12 (3–2, 1 Championship)
AA							648–549	.541	23–10 (8–2, 3 Championships)
Overall							1023–937	.522	36–22 (11–4, 4 Championships)

== Playoffs ==
- 2004 season: Lost to Schaumburg 3–1 in semifinals.
- 2008 season: Defeated Fargo-Moorhead 3–0 in semifinals; defeated Gary SouthShore 3–2 to win championship.
- 2009 season: Lost to Gary SouthShore 3–2 in semifinals.
- 2010 season: Defeated Joliet 3–2 in semifinals; lost to Fargo-Moorhead 3–0 in championship.
- 2018 season: Defeated Sioux City 3–2 in semifinals; defeated St. Paul 3–1 in championship.
- 2019 season: Lost to Sioux City 3–1 in semifinals.
- 2021 season: Defeated Sioux City 3–0 in semifinals; defeated Fargo-Moorhead 3–0 to win championship.
- 2023 season: Defeated Sioux Falls 2–0 in Division Series; defeated Sioux City 2–1 in Championship Series; defeated Chicago 3–1 to win championship.

== Roster ==
Kansas City Monarchs roster
Active roster		Coaching staff
Pitchers: 95 Junior Cerda; 31 Connor Curlis; 83 Yefri Del Rosario ‡; 19 Julian Garcia; 26 Jackson Goddard; 37 Jeff Hakanson; 21 Matt Hall; 28 Damon Jones; 17 J.C. Keys ‡; 32 Zack Leban; 33 Jackson McClelland ‡; 46 Hunter McMahon; 80 Juan Mejia ‡; 16 Gabriel Ponce; 82 Jacques Pucheu ‡; 40 Duncan Snider; 27 Nate Tellier; 39 Collin Wiles	Catchers: 12 Herbert Iser; 15 Hayden Jones; Infielders: 43 Abiatal Avelino; 3 Josh Bissonette; 18 Trent Giambrone; 13 Carson Maxwell; 7 Justin O'Conner; 2 Frankie Tostado; Outfielders: 4 Ross Adolph; 6 Lorenzo Cedrola; 14 Isiah Gilliam; 70 Jhailyn Ortiz ‡; 1 Travis Swaggerty	Manager: 44 Joe Calfapietra; Coaches: Jared Bashaw (trainer); -- Justin Shafer (pitching); 34 Bill Sobbe (hitting); -- John West (coach); 20 Frank White (first base); Disabled list; ‡ Inactive list; § Suspended list; Roster updated August 9, 2024 Transactions

== Notable alumni ==
- Wayne Rosenthal (1993)
- Dana Williams (1993)
- Tom Gilles (1994)
- Jeff Grotewold (1994)
- Greg O'Halloran (1995)
- Bob Zupcic (1995)
- Pat Ahearne (1996)
- Darren Reed (1996)
- Greg Briley (1996–1997)
- Jerald Clark (1997)
- Rich Scheid (1997)
- Randy Tomlin (1997)
- Ozzie Canseco (1998)
- Pat Howell (1999)
- Sean Mulligan (1999)
- Larry See (1999)
- Terry Pearson (2000)
- Jim Rushford (2000)
- Brent Bowers (2001)
- Greg Jelks (2001)
- Derrick Gibson (2002)
- Terry Jones (2002)
- Wascar Serrano (2003)
- Les Norman (2005)
- David Segui (2005)
- Donaldo Méndez (2007)
- Calvin Pickering (2007)
- Travis Schlichting (2007)
- Rick DeHart (2007–2008)
- Bo Hart (2008)
- Kevin Mahar (2008)
- Ken Harvey (2008–2009)
- Damian Rolls (2009)
- Luis Terrero (2009)
- Willie Wilson (2009)
- Justin James (2009–2010)
- Francis Beltrán (2010)
- Dewon Brazelton (2010)
- Erik Hamren (2010)
- Matt Perisho (2010)
- Rico Washington (2010–2011)
- Kris Johnson (2011)
- Prentice Redman (2011)
- Enrique Cruz (2012)
- Steve Kent (2012)
- Brandon Jones (2012–2013)
- Joey Gathright (2013)
- Ray Sadler (2010–2014)
- Daniel Barone (2014)
- Danny Richar (2014)
- Fernando Hernández (2015)
- Tyson Gillies (2016)
- Mike Kickham (2016)
- Josh Tols (2016)
- Cedric Hunter (2017)
- Scott Carroll (2017–2018)
- Zach Walters (2017–2018)
- Jayson Aquino (2018)
- Barrett Astin (2018)
- Todd Cunningham (2018)
- Johnny Davis (2018)
- Taylor Featherston (2018)
- Adrián Nieto (2018)
- Colin Walsh (2018)
- Ryan Brett (2018–2019)
- Chris Colabello (2019)
- Randall Delgado (2019)
- TJ House (2019)
- Daniel Nava (2019)
- Shawn O'Malley (2019)
- Henry Owens (2019)
- Eduardo Paredes (2019)
- Daniel Robertson (2019)
- Brian Ellington (2019, 2021)
- Casey Gillaspie (2019, 2021)
- Eric Stout (2019, 2021)
- Darnell Sweeney (2019, 2021–2022)
- Zack Weiss (2021)
- Johnny Field (2021)
- Nick Franklin (2021)
- Dean Deetz (2021)
- Justin Shafer (2021)
- Keyvius Sampson (2021)
- Paulo Orlando (2021)
- Gabriel Guerrero (2021–2022)
- Jacob Lindgren (2021–2022)
- Matt Hall (2021–2022, 2024–present)
- Jon Harris (2022)
- Akeem Bostick (2022)
- Pete Kozma (2022)
- Lewis Thorpe (2022)
- Mallex Smith (2022)
- Cam Hill (2022)
- Jacob Robson (2022–2023)
- Carlos Sanabria (2023)
- Patrick Weigel (2023)
- Brandon Finnegan (2023)
- Chris Herrmann (2023)
- Keon Broxton (2023)
- Johneshwy Fargas (2023)
- Odúbel Herrera (2023)
- Brian O'Grady (2023)
- Aaron Whitefield (2023)
- Bubby Rossman (2023)
- Zac Grotz (2023)
- Ashton Goudeau (2023–2024)
- Blake Rutherford (2024)
- Tucker Bradley (2024)
- Travis Swaggerty (2024)
- Yefry Ramírez (2024)
- Trent Giambrone (2024)
- A. J. Alexy (2024)
- Damon Jones (2024)
- Chavez Young (2024)
- Abiatal Avelino (2024)
- Justin O'Conner (2024–present)
- Collin Wiles (2024–present)

Achievements
Preceded by St. Paul Saints; 1996	Northern League champions Duluth–Superior Dukes; 1997	Succeeded by Fargo-Moorhead RedHawks; 1998
Preceded by Gary SouthShore RailCats; 2007	Northern League champions Kansas City T-Bones; 2008	Succeeded by Fargo-Moorhead RedHawks; 2009
Preceded by Winnipeg Goldeyes; 2017	American Association champions Kansas City T-Bones; 2018	Succeeded by St. Paul Saints; 2019
