= Red River Valley League =

Minor League Baseball team

- Classification: Class F (1897)
- Sport: Minor League Baseball
- First season: 1897
- Folded: August 8, 1897
- President: Chauncey Wheeler (1897); Senator W. A. Gordon (1897)
- No. of teams: 4
- Country: United States of America
- Most titles: 1 Moorhead Barmaids (1897)

The Red River Valley League was a minor league baseball league that played in the 1897 season. The four–team, Class F level Red River Valley League consisted of teams based in North Dakota and Minnesota. The Red River Valley League played just the 1897 season, before permanently folding. The Moorhead Barmaids were league champions.

== History ==
A "Red River Valley League" played several seasons as a semi–pro league before evolving to become a full minor league in 1897.

The Red River Valley League began minor league baseball play in the 1897 season as a Class F level league. The four charter teams were the Moorhead Barmaids, Grand Forks Senators/Black Stockings, Wahpeton–Breckenridge Methodists and Fargo Divorcees/Fargo Red Stockings. The league presidents were Chauncey Wheeler and Senator W. A. Gordon, who also served as manager of Grand Forks. Player salaries were capped at $40.00 per month by the league.

The Red River Valley League permanently disbanded on August 8, 1897, eight days after the first–half of the season had ended.

At the time the Red River Valley League folded, on August 8, 1897, the Moorhead Barmaids were in first place in the league standings with a 32–13 record. Moorhead was 10.5 games ahead of the second place Grand Forks Senators/Grand Forks Black Stockings (19–21). They were followed by the Wahpeton–Breckenridge Methodists (16–21) and Fargo Divorcees (17–29).

=== Longest scoreless tie in history ===
Notably, the River Valley League's Fargo Red Stockings and Grand Forks Black Stockings played a 25–inning, 0–0 tie on July 18, 1891 in the second game of a doubleheader, a 4 hour and 10 minute game. The ballgame was played at neutral site; Grand Forks owner Tom Hill relocated the series to the North Dakota State Militia Training Grounds in Devils Lake, hoping for larger attendance. William Gibbs of the Grand Forks Black Stockings and George Raymer of the Fargo Red Stockings each pitched a record 25 scoreless innings in the game, the longest scoreless tie in baseball history. The umpire ended the game at 8:10 PM after the completion of the 25th inning because the teams had to catch a train.

== Media ==
The Red River Valley League was the subject of a book, Divorcees, Barmaids, and Cranks: The 1897 Red River Valley Baseball League by Jeffrey J. Bozovsky.

== 1897 Red River Valley League teams ==
Team name	City represented	Ballpark	Year
Fargo Divorcees	Fargo, North Dakota	Unknown	1897
Grand Forks Senators / Grand Forks Black Stockings	Grand Forks, North Dakota	YMCA Park	1897
Moorhead Barmaids	Moorhead, Minnesota	Moorhead ballpark	1897
Wahpeton–Breckenridge Methodists	Breckenridge, Minnesota; Wahpeton, North Dakota	Unknown	1897

== Standings & statistics ==
1897 Red River Valley League

Team standings	W	L	PCT	GB	Managers
Moorhead Barmaids	32	13	.711	–	Sheriff W.J. Bodkin
Grand Forks Senators / Grand Forks Black Stockings	19	21	.475	10½	Senator W.A. Gordon
Wahpeton–Breckenridge Methodists	16	21	.432	12	Ted Corbett
Fargo Divorcees	17	29	.370	15½	Reddy Roberts / Ad Leech; George Challis

Player statistics
Player	Team	Stat	Tot
Pike Mullaney	Moorhead	W	14
Pike Mullaney	Moorhead	PCT	.824; 14–3
