= Barnett Field =

Baseball park in Fargo, North Dakota, US

- Interactive map of Barnett Field
- Address: Fargo, North Dakota; United States
- Coordinates: 46°54′14″N 96°47′25″W

Construction
- Built: 1936
- Opened: 1936
- Closed: 1963
- Demolished: 1963
- Builder: Works Progress Administration

Tenant
- Fargo-Moorhead Twins (NL) 1933–1942, 1946–1960

Barnett Field was a baseball ballpark located in Fargo, North Dakota, United States. The field, named after area attorney William H. Barnett, was a Works Progress Administration project that hosted its first games in 1936. It was home to the Fargo–Moorhead Twins, a minor league baseball team, until 1960. It was demolished in 1963. Fargo North High School was built in its place.
