= 1944 Baseball Hall of Fame balloting =

Elections to the Baseball Hall of Fame

National Baseball

Hall of Fame and Museum
- New inductees: 1
- via Old Timers Committee: 1
- Total inductees: 28
- Induction date: June 13, 1946

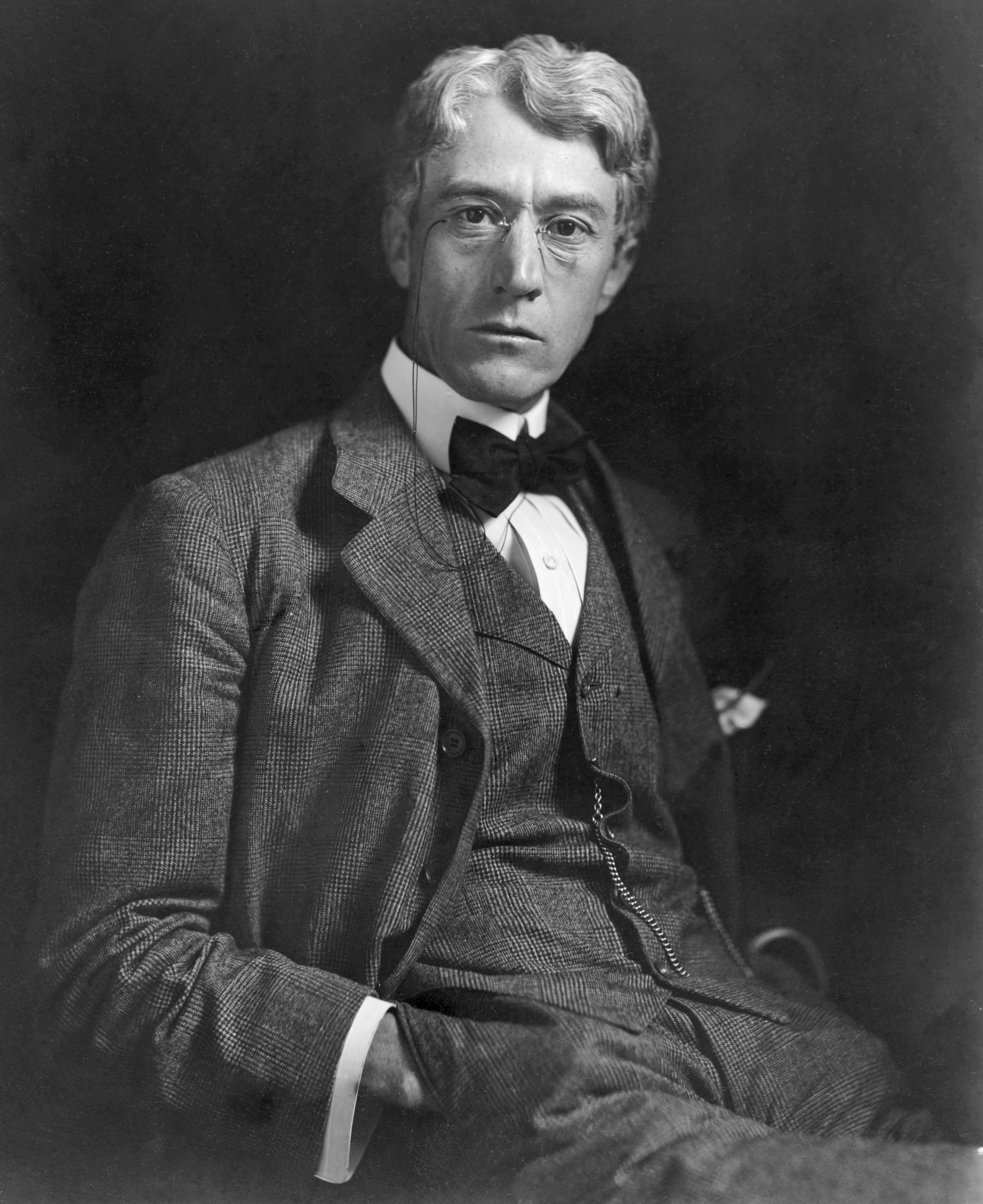
Kenesaw Mountain Landis, sole 1944 inductee

There was no regular election in 1944 to select inductees to the Baseball Hall of Fame. In 1939, the Baseball Writers' Association of America (BBWAA) had moved to hold elections every three years rather than annually, and the next scheduled election was to be in 1945. In addition, the four-member Old-Timers Committee formed in late 1939 to select deserving individuals from the 19th century had still never met for that purpose, and criticism of the lack of honorees from that period was increasing.

== Old-Timers Committee ==
On August 4, 1944, baseball commissioner Kenesaw Mountain Landis named three new members to the Hall of Fame Committee (also known as the Old-Timers Committee), in addition to the four already named. He instructed them to put aside any delay and choose at least 10 individuals from the period 1876–1900 when they met early in 1945, in order that those selected might be honored concurrently with any elected by the BBWAA in their regular election in January. This was a goal the committee members believed they would have no problem meeting, and some noted that the number of deserving players was probably over two dozen. The previously named committee members were: Yankees president Ed Barrow; Athletics owner/manager Connie Mack; New York sportswriter Sid Mercer; and Braves president Bob Quinn. The newly named members were: Hall of Fame president Stephen C. Clark, who would chair the committee; Hall of Fame treasurer Paul S. Kerr, who would serve as committee secretary; and Boston sportswriter Mel Webb.

== Election of Commissioner Landis ==
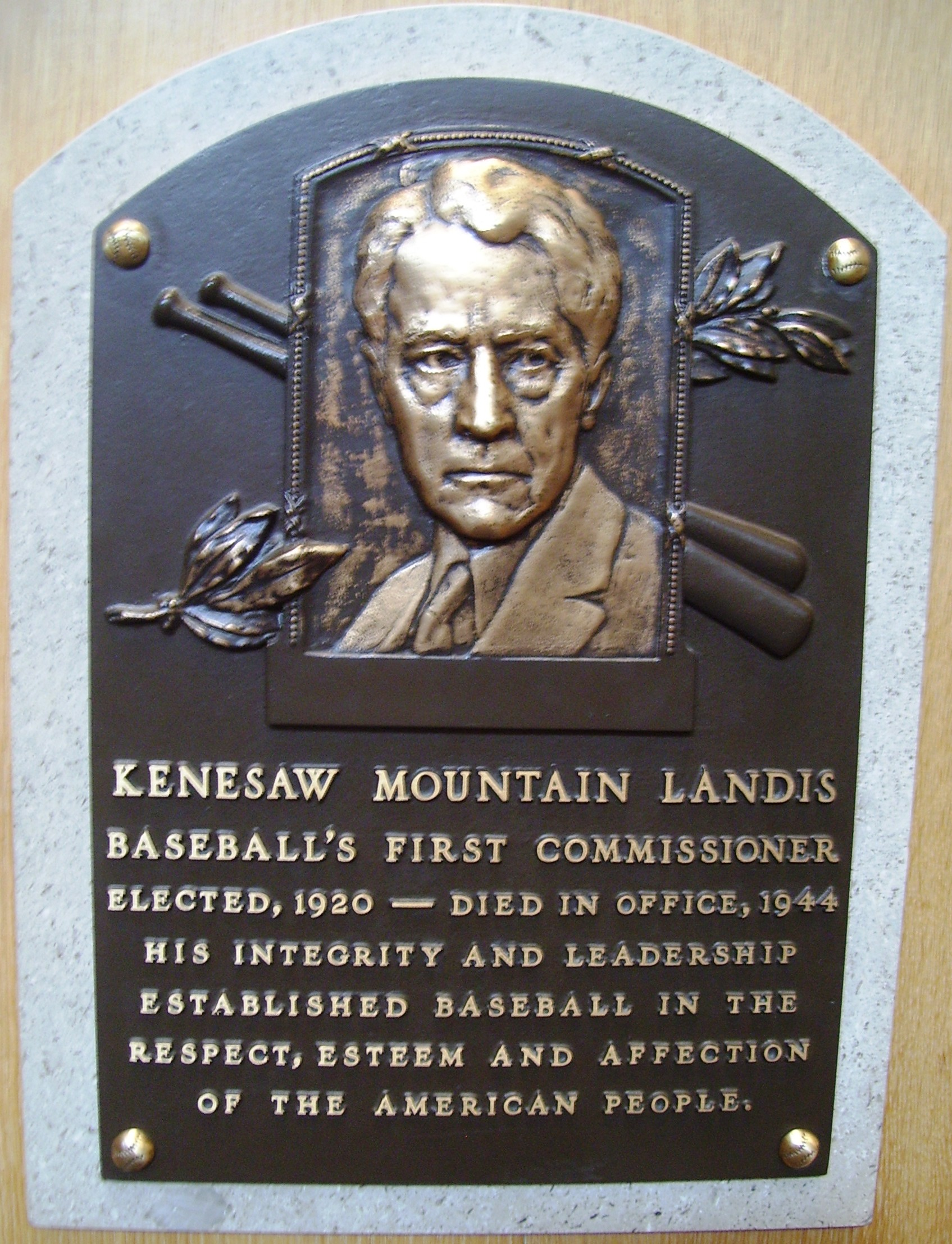
Landis' plaque in the Hall of Fame, 2012

Landis died on November 25, 1944, even as plans were being made to extend his contract for a new seven-year term. Within days, the public and press strongly advocated his immediate election to the Hall. Two weeks after Landis' death, the Old-Timers Committee met at baseball's winter meetings in New York City and elected Landis to membership in the Hall of Fame; Connie Mack sent his approval of the move by telegram from California, where he was vacationing. The members stated that any delay in electing Landis might have resulted in an unfortunate increase in public pressure, possibly creating the impression that the move was somehow forced rather than voluntary. The committee also suggested that if the upcoming BBWAA election failed to select any players whose careers extended into the early 20th century, some would be selected by the committee when they met again in February 1945.

Landis was formally inducted into the Hall of Fame on June 13, 1946, with Governor of New York Thomas Dewey unveiling his plaque in Cooperstown, New York, with dignitaries including Commissioner of Baseball Happy Chandler and National League president Ford Frick in attendance.
