= Frank Gravino =

American baseball player

Frank John Gravino (January 29, 1923 - April 5, 1994) was a longtime minor league baseball outfielder who played from 1940 to 1942 and from 1946 to 1954. Known as the "greatest slugger in Northern League history," he hit .292 with 271 home runs and a .583 slugging percentage in his 12-year career.

Gravino signed with the St. Louis Cardinals and began his career as a 17-year-old pitcher in 1940. Playing for the Class-D Williamson Red Birds that year, he was 10-5 with a Mountain State League-leading 133 walks (in 130 innings pitched) and a 4.57 ERA in 25 games on the mount. He hit .227 with two home runs in 39 games at the plate. The following year, with Williamson and the Class-D Batesville Pilots, he hit .218 with two home runs in 62 games. He only pitched for Batesville that season and had a 3-5 record with a 6.75 ERA in 14 games. He hit .198 with no home runs in 52 games for the Class-D Albany Cardinals in 1942, but was 13-9 with a 3.52 ERA in 28 pitching appearances. He did not play professionally from 1943 to 1945 due to World War II.

He returned to the Cardinals system in 1946 and hit .339 with 30 doubles, 15 triples, 21 home runs and a .628 slugging percentage for the Class-D Hamilton Cardinals and Class-B Allentown Cardinals. The next season, in 115 games split between the Class-C Winston-Salem Cardinals (104 games) and Class-A Omaha Royals (11 games), Gravino hit .299 with 16 home runs. He hit .277 with 18 home runs and 74 RBI for the Triple-A Rochester Red Wings in 1948 and in 1949, in a year split between the Class-A Columbus Cardinals and Omaha, he hit .273 with seven home runs in 70 games.

He left the Cardinals system following the 1949 season and played in the Panamanian Professional Baseball League that winter. He then played in unaffiliated baseball in 1950 and 1951. In 1950, he hit .252 with 18 home runs in 80 games split between the Class-C St. Jean Braves and Class-B St. Petersburg Saints, finishing second, behind Silvio Garcia, in the Provincial League in home runs. He had his first of four straight 35-plus home run seasons in 1951, hitting .289 with 42 home runs in 121 games for St. Jean. He led the Provincial League in home runs and was second in total bases (284) and slugging percentage (.627), behind Joseph Monteiro and Johnny Davis, respectively. Gravino spent most of 1952 with the unaffiliated Class-C Fargo-Moorhead Twins, but began year with the Class-B Cedar Rapids Indians in the Cleveland Indians system. Overall, he hit .280 with 37 home runs in 121 games. He led the Northern League in home runs, RBI (108) and slugging percentage (.643) and made the Northern League All-Star team that season.

With Fargo-Moorhead - now an Indians affiliate - again in 1953, Gravino hit .352 with 52 home runs, 174 RBI, 12 triples, 369 total bases and a .783 slugging percentage in 125 games. He led the Northern League in home runs (the second place finisher had 18), RBI, slugging percentage and total bases. He set league records in home runs and RBI. He placed behind Horace Greenwood in hits with 166, finished behind Santo Luberto in batting average, tied for second in games played and tied for third in triples. His hot hitting helped propel the Twins to a league pennant that season and earned him league MVP honors. Also of note, he played alongside Roger Maris in the outfield that season. He returned to the Twins in 1954 and hit .301 with a record-breaking 56 home runs, 354 total bases and a .707 slugging percentage in 135 games, again leading the Twins to a pennant. Once again, he led the Northern League in hits, slugging percentage and total bases while outnumbering the home run outputs of four entire Northern League teams that season. Despite putting up league-leading numbers in 1954, deteriorating eyesight forced him to end his career prematurely.

Overall, Gravino hit .292 with 1,144 hits, 199 doubles, 64 triples, 271 home runs and a .583 slugging percentage in 1,148 games. He hit over 20 home runs five times and exceeded the .300 batting mark thrice.

He was born in Newark, New York and died in Rochester, New York.
