= Fargo–Moorhead Twins =

- (1908, 1914–1917, 1922, 1933–1942, 1946–1960); Fargo, North Dakota Moorhead, Minnesota

Minor league affiliations
- Previous classes: Class-D (1908, 1914–1917, 1922, 1933–1942, 1946–1960)
- Previous leagues: Red River Valley League (1897); Northern League (1908, 1914–1917); Dakota League (1922); Northern League (1933–1942, 1946–1960)

Major league affiliations
- Previous teams: Cleveland Indians (1934–1940); Pittsburgh Pirates (1947–1948); Cleveland Indians (1953–1957); New York Yankees (1958–1960)

Minor league titles
- League titles: 6 (1915, 1917, 1934, 1953, 1954, 1958)

Team data
- Previous names: Fargo Divorcees/Fargo Red Stockings(1897); Moorhead Barmaids (1897; Fargo Browns (1908); Fargo-Moorhead Graingrowers (1914–1917); Fargo Athletics (1922); Fargo-Moorhead Twins (1933–1942, 1946–1960)
- Previous parks: Moorhead Ballpark (1933–1935); Barnett Field (1936–1960)

The Fargo–Moorhead Twins were a minor league baseball team that existed from 1933 to 1942 and from 1946 to 1960, representing the neighboring cities of Fargo, North Dakota and Moorhead, Minnesota. The Twins won six league championships during their seasons of play. Earlier minor league teams had also represented the cities. Baseball Hall of Fame members Dizzy Dean (1941) and Lloyd Waner (1947) are Fargo–Moorhead Twins alumni, as is 2x AL Most Valuable Player Roger Maris.

== History ==
The Fargo–Moorhead Twins played in the Northern League from 1933 to 1942 and 1946–1960. The Twins were an affiliate of the Cleveland Indians (1934–1940, 1953–1957), Pittsburgh Pirates (1947–1948) and New York Yankees (1958–1960).

The preceding Fargo–Moorhead area teams were the 1897 Red River Valley League members Fargo Red Stockings and Moorhead Barmaids, who were the first area minor league franchises. Fargo (1902–1905), the Fargo Browns (1908) and Fargo-Moorehead Graingrowers (1914–1917) all played as members of the Northern League and the 1922 Fargo Athletics played in the 1922 Dakota League.

On May 6, 1953, the Fargo–Moorhead Twins defeated Sioux Falls in their Opening Day game by a score of 12–3. A record crowd of 10,123 fans came to Barnett Field. In the game, Roger Maris got his first professional baseball hit. That season, Twins player Frank Gravino would hit 52 home runs. The Twins would host the Northern League All-Star game and defeat the Northern League All-Stars by a score of 8–4. The Twins finished with a record of 86-39 (improving from their record of 44–80 in 1952) and bested Duluth to win the Northern League championship. Roger Maris would be selected as the 1953 Northern League Rookie of the Year.

Fargo–Moorhead teams won Northern League Championships in 1915, 1917, 1934, 1953, 1954, 1958, claiming six overall titles.

Baseball would return to Fargo Moorhead in 1996 when the Fargo Moorhead Redhawks joined the new Northern League.

== The ballparks ==
From 1936 to 1960, the Fargo–Moorhead Twins played their home games at Barnett Field in Fargo, North Dakota. It was located at 19th Avenue and Broadway and was torn down in 1963 to build North High School.

In addition to Barnett Field, in 1933–1935, Fargo–Moorhead teams played select home games at Moorhead Ballpark in Moorhead, Minnesota.

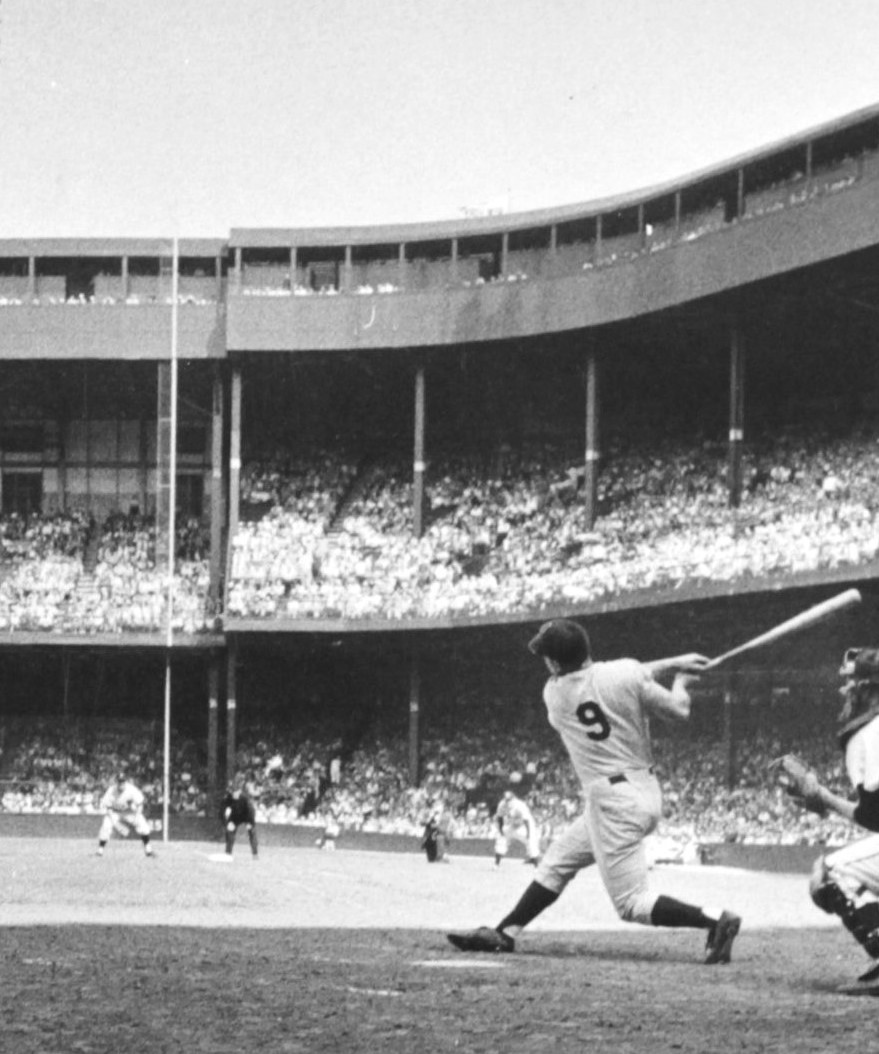
1961 Roger Maris hits HR #58. He hit 61 Home runs in 1961

== Notable alumni ==
- Dizzy Dean (1941) Inducted Baseball Hall of Fame, 1953
- Lloyd Waner (1947, MGR) Inducted Baseball Hall of Fame, 1967
- Horace Clarke (1960)
- Mudcat Grant (1954) 2x MLB All-Star
- Steve Gromek (1940) MLB All-Star
- Danny Litwhiler (1952) MLB All-Star
- Ray Mack (1938) MLB All-Star
- Roger Maris (1953) 7x MLB All-Star; 2x AL Most Valuable Player (1960–1961)
- Pete Mikkelsen (1960)
- Joe Pepitone (1959) 3x MLB All-Star
- Jim Perry (1957) 3x MLB All-Star; 1970 AL Cy Young Award
- Dick Stigman (1954) 2x MLB All-Star
- Ron Taylor (1957)
- Ben Tincup (1942)
- Bob Unglaub (1914–1916)
- Bill Zuber (1934)

== Year-by-year records ==
Year	Record	Finish	Manager	Playoffs
1933	30-75	8th	Alvin Theis / Ralph Williams	Did not qualify
1934	64-53	1st	Jack Knight	League champions
1935	72-39	2nd	Hal Irelan	Lost League Finals
1936	59-61	5th	Hal Irelan	Did not qualify
1937	70-41	2nd	Jack Knight	Lost League Finals
1938	60-56	5th	Jack Knight	Did not qualify
1939	66-48	3rd	Jack Knight / Chester Bujaci	Lost in 1st round
1940	50-67	6th	Chester Bujaci / Wes Griffin	Did not qualify
1941	48-69	6th	Wes Griffin / Mike Blazo	Did not qualify
1942	54-68	7th	Mike Blazo / Ben Tincup	Did not qualify
1946	63-41	2nd	Bruno Haas	Lost League Finals
1947	70-49	3rd	Bruno Haas	Lost in 1st round
1948	41-85	8th	Bruno Haas / Ralph DiLullo	Did not qualify
1949	56-70	7th	Art Doll	Did not qualify
1950	49-77	8th	Art Doll	Did not qualify
1951	59-65	6th	Emil Gall	Did not qualify
1952	44-80	7th	Nick Cullop / Bob Harmon; Danny Litwhiler	Did not qualify
1953	86-39	1st	Zeke Bonura / Santo Luberto	League champions
1954	85-55	1st	Phil Seghi	League champions
1955	61-64	5th	Phil Seghi / Paul O'Dea	Did not qualify
1956	49-74	8th	Tom Oliver	Did not qualify
1957	65-57	4th	Frank Tornay / Ken Blackman	Did not qualify
1958	72-51	2nd	Ken Silvestri	League champions
1959	64-59	3rd	Dee Phillips	Lost in 1st round
1960	58-66	6th	John Fitzpatrick	Did not qualify
