= List of Chicago White Sox minor league affiliates =

Current Chicago White Sox domestic minor league affiliate locations

The Chicago White Sox farm system consists of six Minor League Baseball affiliates across the United States and in the Dominican Republic. Four teams are independently owned, while two—the Arizona Complex League White Sox and Dominican Summer League White Sox—are owned by the major league club.

The White Sox have been affiliated with the Double-A Birmingham Barons of the Southern League since 1986, making it the longest-running active affiliation in the organization among teams not owned by the White Sox. It is also the longest affiliation in the team's history. Their newest affiliate is the Single-A Kannapolis Cannon Ballers of the Carolina League, which became a White Sox' affiliate in 2001.

Geographically, Chicago's closest domestic affiliate is the High-A Winston-Salem Dash of the South Atlantic League, which are approximately 560 miles (900 km) away. Chicago's furthest domestic affiliate is the Arizona Complex League White Sox of the Rookie Arizona Complex League some 1,459 miles (2,348 km) away.

== Current affiliates ==
The Chicago White Sox farm system consists of six minor league affiliates.

Class	Team	League	Location	Ballpark	Affiliated
Triple-A	Charlotte Knights	International League	Charlotte, North Carolina	Truist Field	1999
Double-A	Birmingham Barons	Southern League	Birmingham, Alabama	Regions Field	1986
High-A	Winston-Salem Dash	South Atlantic League	Winston-Salem, North Carolina	Truist Stadium	1997
Single-A	Kannapolis Cannon Ballers	Carolina League	Kannapolis, North Carolina	Atrium Health Ballpark	2001
Rookie	ACL White Sox	Arizona Complex League	Glendale, Arizona	Camelback Ranch	2014
Rookie	DSL White Sox	Dominican Summer League	Boca Chica, Santo Domingo	Baseball City Complex	1999

== Past affiliates ==
=== Key ===
Season	Each year is linked to an article about that particular White Sox season.

=== 1932–1962 ===
Minor League Baseball operated with five classes (Double-A, Class A, Class B, Class C, and Class D) from 1932 to 1935. Class A1, between Double-A and Class A, was added in 1936. The minors continued to operate with these six levels through 1945. Triple-A was established as the highest classification in 1946, and Class A1 became Double-A, with Class A through D remaining. These six levels continued through 1962. The Pacific Coast League (PCL) was reclassified from Triple-A to Open in 1952 due to the possibility of becoming a third major league. This arrangement ended following the 1957 season when the relocation of the National League's Dodgers and Giants to the West Coast ended any chance of the PCL being promoted.

Season	Triple-A	Double-A	Class A	Class B	Class C	Class D	Ref.
1932	—	—	—	—	—	Waterloo Hawks	
1933	—	—	—	—	—	—	
1934	—	—	—	—	Longview Cannibals	—	
1935	—	St. Paul Saints	Dallas Steers	—	Longview Cannibals	Moultrie Steers	
1936	—	Kansas City Blues	Dallas Steers (A1)	—	Longview Cannibals	Crookston Pirates; Moultrie Packers; Rayne Rice Birds	
1937	—	St. Paul Saints	Dallas Steers (A1)	—	Dayton Ducks; Longview Cannibals; Marshall Tigers; Vicksburg Hill Billies	Rayne Rice Birds	
1938	—	St. Paul Saints	Dallas Steers (A1)	Anniston Rams	Longview Cannibals	DeLand Reds; Lubbock Hubbers; Rayne Rice Birds	
1939	—	St. Paul Saints	Shreveport Sports (A1)	Anniston Rams	Longview Cannibals	Greenville Lions; Lubbock Hubbers; Jonesboro White Sox	
1940	—	—	—	Waterloo Hawks	—	Grand Forks Chiefs; Lubbock Hubbers; Jonesboro White Sox; Wisconsin Rapids White Sox	
1941	—	—	—	Waterloo Hawks	Grand Forks Chiefs; Saginaw White Sox	Lubbock Hubbers; Jonesboro White Sox; Wisconsin Rapids White Sox	
1942	—	—	Shreveport Sports (A1)	Waterloo Hawks	Grand Forks Chiefs; Superior Blues	Lockport White Sox; Wisconsin Rapids White Sox	
1943	—	—	—	—	—	—	
1944	—	—	Little Rock Travelers (A1)	—	—	—	
1945	—	—	Little Rock Travelers (A1)	—	—	—	
1946	Milwaukee Brewers	Little Rock Travelers; Shreveport Sports	Greenville Spinners	Waterloo White Hawks	Superior Blues; Texarkana Bears	Alexandria Aces; Brewton Millers; Cordele White Sox; Lima Terriers; Madisonville Miners; New River Rebels; Wisconsin Rapids White Sox	
1947	Hollywood Stars	—	—	Fall River Indians; Waterloo White Hawks	Oil City Refiners; Superior Blues	Lima Terriers; Madisonville Miners; Wisconsin Rapids White Sox	
1948	Hollywood Stars	Memphis Chickasaws	Muskegon Clippers	Fall River Indians; Waterloo White Hawks	Hot Springs Bathers; Oil City Refiners; Superior Blues	Kingsport Cherokees; Lima Terriers; Madisonville Miners; Seminole Oilers; Wisconsin Rapids White Sox	
1949	—	Memphis Chickasaws	Charleston Rebels; Muskegon Clippers	Fall River Indians; Waterloo White Hawks	Hot Springs Bathers; Oil City Refiners; Stockton Ports; Superior Blues	Madisonville Miners; Seminole Oilers; Wisconsin Rapids White Sox	
1950	Sacramento Solons	Memphis Chickasaws	Colorado Springs Sky Sox	Waterloo White Hawks	Hot Springs Bathers; Superior Blues	Madisonville Miners; Wisconsin Rapids White Sox	
1951	Sacramento Solons	Memphis Chickasaws	Colorado Springs Sky Sox	Waterloo White Hawks	Hot Springs Bathers; Superior Blues	Madisonville Miners; Wisconsin Rapids White Sox	
1952	Toledo Mud Hens / Charleston Senators	Memphis Chickasaws	Colorado Springs Sky Sox	Gastonia Rockets; Waterloo White Hawks	Superior Blues	Madisonville Miners; Wisconsin Rapids White Sox	
1953	Charleston Senators	Memphis Chickasaws	Colorado Springs Sky Sox	Waterloo White Hawks	Topeka Owls	Danville Dans; Madisonville Miners; Wisconsin Rapids White Sox	
1954	Charleston Senators	Memphis Chickasaws	Colorado Springs Sky Sox	Waterloo White Hawks	Topeka Owls	Dubuque Packers; Madisonville Miners	
1955	—	Memphis Chickasaws	Colorado Springs Sky Sox	Waterloo White Hawks	Superior Blues	Dubuque Packers; Madisonville Miners	
1956	—	Memphis Chickasaws	Colorado Springs Sky Sox	Waterloo White Hawks	Duluth-Superior White Sox	Dubuque Packers; Holdrege White Sox	
1957	Indianapolis Indians	—	Colorado Springs Sky Sox	Davenport DavSox	Duluth-Superior White Sox	Dubuque Packers; Holdrege White Sox	
1958	Indianapolis Indians	—	Colorado Springs Sky Sox	Davenport DavSox	Duluth-Superior White Sox	Dubuque Packers; Holdrege White Sox	
1959	Indianapolis Indians	—	Charleston ChaSox	Lincoln Chiefs	Duluth-Superior Dukes	Clinton Pirates; Holdrege White Sox	
1960	San Diego Padres	—	Charleston White Sox	Lincoln Chiefs	Idaho Falls Russets	Clinton C-Sox; Pensacola Angels	
1961	San Diego Padres	—	Charleston White Sox	Lincoln Chiefs	Idaho Falls Russets	Clinton C-Sox; Daytona Beach Islanders	
1962	Indianapolis Indians	—	Savannah/Lynchburg White Sox	—	Visalia White Sox	Clinton C-Sox; Sarasota Sun Sox	

=== 1963–1989 ===
Prior to the 1963 season, Major League Baseball (MLB) initiated a reorganization of Minor League Baseball that resulted in a reduction from six classes to four (Triple-A, Double-A, Class A, and Rookie) in response to the general decline of the minors throughout the 1950s and early-1960s when leagues and teams folded due to shrinking attendance caused by baseball fans' preference for staying at home to watch MLB games on television. The only change made within the next 27 years was Class A being subdivided for the first time to form Class A Short Season in 1966.

Season	Triple-A	Double-A	Class A	Class A Short Season	Rookie	Ref(s).
1963	Indianapolis Indians	Lynchburg White Sox	Clinton C-Sox; Eugene Emeralds; Sarasota Sun Sox	—	—	
1964	Indianapolis Indians	Lynchburg White Sox	Clinton C-Sox; Sarasota Sun Sox; Tidewater Tides	—	SRL White Sox	
1965	Indianapolis Indians	Lynchburg White Sox	Clinton C-Sox; Sarasota Sun Sox; Tidewater Tides	—	FRL White Sox	
1966	Indianapolis Indians	Evansville White Sox	Fox Cities Foxes; Lynchburg White Sox; Deerfield Beach/Winter Haven Sun Sox	—	GCL White Sox	
1967	Indianapolis Indians	Evansville White Sox	Appleton Foxes; Lynchburg White Sox	—	GCL White Sox	
1968	Hawaii Islanders	Evansville White Sox	Appleton Foxes; Lynchburg White Sox	Duluth–Superior Dukes	GCL White Sox	
1969	Tucson Toros	Columbus White Sox	Lynchburg White Sox	Duluth–Superior Dukes	GCL White Sox	
1970	Tucson Toros	Mobile White Sox	Appleton Foxes	Duluth–Superior Dukes	GCL White Sox	
1971	Tucson Toros	Asheville Tourists	Appleton Foxes	—	GCL White Sox	
1972	Tucson Toros	Knoxville Sox	Appleton Foxes	—	GCL White Sox	
1973	Iowa Oaks	Knoxville Sox	Appleton Foxes	—	GCL White Sox	
1974	Iowa Oaks	Knoxville Sox	Appleton Foxes	—	GCL White Sox	
1975	Denver Bears	Knoxville Sox	Appleton Foxes	—	GCL White Sox	
1976	Iowa Oaks	Knoxville Sox	Appleton Foxes	—	GCL White Sox	
1977	Iowa Oaks	Knoxville Sox	Appleton Foxes	—	GCL White Sox	
1978	Iowa Oaks	Knoxville Sox	Appleton Foxes	—	—	
1979	Iowa Oaks	Knoxville Sox	Appleton Foxes	—	GCL White Sox	
1980	Iowa Oaks	Glens Falls White Sox	Appleton Foxes	—	GCL White Sox	
1981	Edmonton Trappers	Glens Falls White Sox	Appleton Foxes	—	GCL White Sox	
1982	Edmonton Trappers	Glens Falls White Sox	Appleton Foxes	Niagara Falls Sox	GCL White Sox	
1983	Denver Bears	Glens Falls White Sox	Appleton Foxes	Niagara Falls Sox	GCL White Sox	
1984	Denver Zephyrs	Glens Falls White Sox	Appleton Foxes	Niagara Falls Sox	GCL White Sox	
1985	Buffalo Bisons	Glens Falls White Sox	Appleton Foxes	Niagara Falls Sox	GCL White Sox	
1986	Buffalo Bisons	Birmingham Barons	Appleton Foxes; Peninsula White Sox	—	GCL White Sox	
1987	Hawaii Islanders	Birmingham Barons	Daytona Beach Admirals; Peninsula White Sox	—	GCL White Sox	
1988	Vancouver Canadians	Birmingham Barons	South Bend White Sox; Tampa White Sox	Utica Blue Sox	GCL White Sox	
1989	Vancouver Canadians	Birmingham Barons	Sarasota White Sox; South Bend White Sox	Utica Blue Sox	GCL White Sox; DSL White Sox/Astros/Rangers	

=== 1990–2020 ===
Minor League Baseball operated with six classes from 1990 to 2020. In 1990, the Class A level was subdivided for a second time with the creation of Class A-Advanced. The Rookie level consisted of domestic and foreign circuits.

Season	Triple-A	Double-A	Class A-Advanced	Class A	Class A Short Season	Rookie	Foreign Rookie	Ref(s).
1990	Vancouver Canadians	Birmingham Barons	Sarasota White Sox	South Bend White Sox	Utica Blue Sox	GCL White Sox	DSL White Sox/Orioles	
1991	Vancouver Canadians	Birmingham Barons	Sarasota White Sox	South Bend White Sox	Utica Blue Sox	GCL White Sox	DSL White Sox/Orioles	
1992	Vancouver Canadians	Birmingham Barons	Sarasota White Sox	South Bend White Sox	Utica Blue Sox	GCL White Sox	DSL White Sox/Orioles	
1993	Nashville Sounds	Birmingham Barons	Sarasota White Sox	Hickory Crawdads; South Bend White Sox	—	GCL White Sox	DSL White Sox/Orioles	
1994	Nashville Sounds	Birmingham Barons	Prince William Cannons	Hickory Crawdads; South Bend Silver Hawks	—	GCL White Sox	—	
1995	Nashville Sounds	Birmingham Barons	Prince William Cannons	Hickory Crawdads; South Bend Silver Hawks	—	Bristol White Sox; GCL White Sox	DSL White Sox/Orioles	
1996	Nashville Sounds	Birmingham Barons	Prince William Cannons	Hickory Crawdads; South Bend Silver Hawks	—	Bristol White Sox; GCL White Sox	DSL White Sox/Brewers	
1997	Nashville Sounds	Birmingham Barons	Winston-Salem Warthogs	Hickory Crawdads	—	Bristol White Sox; GCL White Sox	—	
1998	Calgary Cannons	Birmingham Barons	Winston-Salem Warthogs	Hickory Crawdads	—	Bristol White Sox; AZL White Sox	DSL White Sox/Angels	
1999	Charlotte Knights	Birmingham Barons	Winston-Salem Warthogs	Burlington Bees	—	Bristol White Sox; AZL White Sox	DSL White Sox	
2000	Charlotte Knights	Birmingham Barons	Winston-Salem Warthogs	Burlington Bees	—	Bristol White Sox; AZL White Sox	DSL White Sox	
2001	Charlotte Knights	Birmingham Barons	Winston-Salem Warthogs	Kannapolis Intimidators	—	Bristol White Sox; AZL White Sox	DSL White Sox	
2002	Charlotte Knights	Birmingham Barons	Winston-Salem Warthogs	Kannapolis Intimidators	—	Bristol White Sox; AZL White Sox	DSL White Sox	
2003	Charlotte Knights	Birmingham Barons	Winston-Salem Warthogs	Kannapolis Intimidators	—	Bristol White Sox; Great Falls White Sox	DSL White Sox	
2004	Charlotte Knights	Birmingham Barons	Winston-Salem Warthogs	Kannapolis Intimidators	—	Bristol White Sox; Great Falls White Sox	DSL White Sox	
2005	Charlotte Knights	Birmingham Barons	Winston-Salem Warthogs	Kannapolis Intimidators	—	Bristol White Sox; Great Falls White Sox	DSL White Sox	
2006	Charlotte Knights	Birmingham Barons	Winston-Salem Warthogs	Kannapolis Intimidators	—	Bristol White Sox; Great Falls White Sox	DSL White Sox; VSL White Sox/Orioles	
2007	Charlotte Knights	Birmingham Barons	Winston-Salem Warthogs	Kannapolis Intimidators	—	Bristol White Sox; Great Falls White Sox	DSL White Sox 1 DSL White Sox 2	
2008	Charlotte Knights	Birmingham Barons	Winston-Salem Warthogs	Kannapolis Intimidators	—	Bristol White Sox; Great Falls Voyagers	DSL White Sox 1 DSL White Sox 2	
2009	Charlotte Knights	Birmingham Barons	Winston-Salem Dash	Kannapolis Intimidators	—	Bristol White Sox; Great Falls Voyagers	DSL White Sox	
2010	Charlotte Knights	Birmingham Barons	Winston-Salem Dash	Kannapolis Intimidators	—	Bristol White Sox; Great Falls Voyagers	DSL White Sox	
2011	Charlotte Knights	Birmingham Barons	Winston-Salem Dash	Kannapolis Intimidators	—	Bristol White Sox; Great Falls Voyagers	DSL White Sox	
2012	Charlotte Knights	Birmingham Barons	Winston-Salem Dash	Kannapolis Intimidators	—	Bristol White Sox; Great Falls Voyagers	DSL White Sox	
2013	Charlotte Knights	Birmingham Barons	Winston-Salem Dash	Kannapolis Intimidators	—	Bristol White Sox; Great Falls Voyagers	DSL White Sox	
2014	Charlotte Knights	Birmingham Barons	Winston-Salem Dash	Kannapolis Intimidators	—	Great Falls Voyagers; AZL White Sox	DSL White Sox	
2015	Charlotte Knights	Birmingham Barons	Winston-Salem Dash	Kannapolis Intimidators	—	Great Falls Voyagers; AZL White Sox	DSL White Sox	
2016	Charlotte Knights	Birmingham Barons	Winston-Salem Dash	Kannapolis Intimidators	—	Great Falls Voyagers; AZL White Sox	DSL White Sox	
2017	Charlotte Knights	Birmingham Barons	Winston-Salem Dash	Kannapolis Intimidators	—	Great Falls Voyagers; AZL White Sox	DSL White Sox	
2018	Charlotte Knights	Birmingham Barons	Winston-Salem Dash	Kannapolis Intimidators	—	Great Falls Voyagers; AZL White Sox	DSL White Sox	
2019	Charlotte Knights	Birmingham Barons	Winston-Salem Dash	Kannapolis Intimidators	—	Great Falls Voyagers; AZL White Sox	DSL White Sox	
2020 (Note: The 2020 Minor League Baseball season was cancelled due to the COVID-19 pandemic.)	Charlotte Knights	Birmingham Barons	Winston-Salem Dash	Kannapolis Cannon Ballers	—	Great Falls Voyagers; AZL White Sox	DSL White Sox	

=== 2021–present ===
The current structure of Minor League Baseball is the result of an overall contraction of the system beginning with the 2021 season. Class A was reduced to two levels: High-A and Low-A. Low-A was reclassified as Single-A in 2022.

Season	Triple-A	Double-A	High-A	Single-A	Rookie	Foreign Rookie	Ref.
2021	Charlotte Knights	Birmingham Barons	Winston-Salem Dash	Kannapolis Cannon Ballers	ACL White Sox	DSL White Sox	
2022	Charlotte Knights	Birmingham Barons	Winston-Salem Dash	Kannapolis Cannon Ballers	ACL White Sox	DSL White Sox	
2023	Charlotte Knights	Birmingham Barons	Winston-Salem Dash	Kannapolis Cannon Ballers	ACL White Sox	DSL White Sox	
2024	Charlotte Knights	Birmingham Barons	Winston-Salem Dash	Kannapolis Cannon Ballers	ACL White Sox	DSL White Sox	
2025	Charlotte Knights	Birmingham Barons	Winston-Salem Dash	Kannapolis Cannon Ballers	ACL White Sox	DSL White Sox	
2026	Charlotte Knights	Birmingham Barons	Winston-Salem Dash	Kannapolis Cannon Ballers	ACL White Sox	DSL White Sox	
