= Waterloo White Hawks =

Minor league baseball team in Iowa, US

The Waterloo White Hawks were a minor league baseball team based in Based in Waterloo, Iowa. that existed from 1940 to 1942 and 1946 to 1956. They played in the Three-I League and were affiliated with the Chicago White Sox. The team played in Riverfront Stadium in Waterloo.

== History ==
The Waterloo White Hawks were a minor league baseball team in Waterloo, Iowa that existed from 1940 to 1942 and 1946 to 1956. Previous incarnations of the team were the Waterloo Boosters and the Waterloo Red Hawks. The White Hawks played in the Class B Three-I League in Iowa, Illinois, and Indiana. They were affiliated with the Chicago White Sox.

The White Hawks originally played their home games in Waterloo at Red Hawk Stadium. In 1946, they moved to the new Municipal Stadium, later called Riverfront Stadium. In 1946, the team's paid attendance was 85,119. The White Hawks led the Three-I League in attendance in 1947, with 174,064 paid audience members. That year, the White Hawks tied for third place in the Three-I League's regular season and finished in first place in the playoffs against the Danville Dodgers.

Some of the Waterloo White Hawks players who also had careers in Major League Baseball include shortstop Luis Aparicio, catcher Earl Battey, pitcher Jim Hughes, firstbaseman Norm Cash, and pitcher Barry Latman. Batley was the Three-I Rookie of the Year in 1954.

When the White Hawks' affiliation with the White Sox ended in 1956, the team stopped playing; when it reformed in 1958, it no longer used the White Hawks name.

== Notable players ==
- Fritz Ackley, pitcher
- Luis Aparicio, shortstop
- Gideon Applegate, pitcher
- Rudy Árias, pitcher
- Don Bacon, shortstop and second baseman
- Earl Battey, catcher
- Jim Baumer, secondbaseman
- Don Bradey, pitcher
- Louis Brower, shortstop
- Jack Bruner, pitcher
- Jerry Bunyard
- Jim Busby, outfielder
- Bill Cash, catcher
- Norm Cash, outfielder
- Alex Cosmidis, second baseman
- Otto Denning, catcher
- Sammy Esposito, shortstop
- Bill Fischer, pitcher
- Tom Flanigan, pitcher
- Val Heim
- Russ Heman, pitcher
- Ed Hobaugh, pitcher and outfielder
- Jim Hughes, pitcher
- Tom Hurd, pitcher and third base
- Deacon Jones, infielder
- Howie Judson, pitcher
- Gus Keriazakos, pitcher
- Joe Kirrene, right fielder and third baseman
- Jack Kralick, pitcher
- Barry Latman, pitcher
- Willard Marshall, outfielder
- Jim McAnany, outfielder
- Ed McGhee, outfielder
- John Perkovich, pitcher
- Jay Porter, catcher and outfielder
- Johnny Romano, catcher
- Glen Rosenbaum, pitcher
- Marv Rotblatt, pitcher
- Jerry Scala, outfielder
- Chips Sobek, second base
- Joe Stephenson
- Dick Strahs, pitcher
- Vito Valentinetti, pitcher
- Verl Westergard, pitcher
- Ed White, outfielder
- Frank Whitman, shortstop
- Red Wilson, catcher
- Bobby Winkles, shortstop
- Pete Wojey, pitcher

== Year-by-year records ==
Year	Record	Finish	Manager	Playoffs	References
1940	36-85	8th	John Fitzpatrick	Did not qualify	
1940	36-85	8th	Frederick "Eagle" Bedore	Did not qualify	
1941	59-65	5th	Louis Brower	Did not qualify	
1941	59-65	5th	Johnny Mostil	Did not qualify	
1942	47-71	5th	Johnny Mostil	Did not qualify	
1946	62-63	5th	Johnny Mostil	Did not qualify	
1947	71-55	3rd (tie)	Johnny Mostil	Winner	
1947	71-55	3rd (tie)	Jack Onslow	Winner	
1948	63-61	5th	Pete Fox	Did not qualify	
1949	70-56	3rd	Ben Huffman	Lost in 1st round	
1950	70-56	3rd	Otto Denning	Lost in 1st round	
1951	60-69	5th	Otto Denning	Did not qualify	
1951	60-69	5th	Edward Taylor	Did not qualify	
1951	60-69	5th	Skeeter Webb	Did not qualify	
1952	65-61	3rd	Skeeter Webb	Lost in 1st round	
1953	69-60	4th	Zack Taylor	Lost in 1st round	
1954	66-69	5th	Wally Millies	Did not qualify	
1955	70-56	2nd	Dutch Dorman	Lost in 1st round	
1955	70-56	2nd	Johnny Mostil	Lost in 1st round	
1955	70-56	2nd	Willard Marshall	Lost in 1st round	
1956	62-56	2nd	Ira Hutchinson	No playoffs held	

== See also ==
- List of Chicago White Sox minor league affiliates
- Waterloo Hawks (baseball)
