= 2015 Northwoods League season =

22nd annual season of the Northwoods League

- League: Northwoods League
- Sport: Baseball
- Teams: 18

Northwoods League Championship
- Champions: Kenosha Kingfish
- Runners-up: St. Cloud Rox

Seasons
- ← 2014 2016 →

The 2015 Northwoods League season was the 22nd season of baseball in the Northwoods League, a collegiate summer baseball organization. The season concluded in August with the Kenosha Kingfish winning the championship.

== Season overview ==
=== Background ===
In 2015, the NWL had eighteen teams, split evenly between a North and South Division. The Lakeshore Chinooks entered the season as defending champions, having defeated the Mankato MoonDogs in the 2014 NWL championship series.

=== Season ===
The regular season began in May, with the season split into two halves. The teams with the best records in the division for each half automatically qualified for a playoff berth. Starting in 2015, two additional teams from each division were added to the playoffs based on overall season record, and competed in a quarterfinal round of the playoffs. This resulted in eight teams qualifying for the playoffs.

The playoff qualifiers for each division were as follows:

- North Division - St. Cloud Rox, Duluth Huskies, Rochester Honkers, Willmar Stingers
- South Division - La Crosse Loggers, Kenosha Kingfish, Madison Mallards, Green Bay Bullfrogs

In the four single-elimination first round playoff games, the Huskies beat the Stingers, the Rox beat the Honkers, the Kingfish beat the Loggers, and the Mallards beat the Bullfrogs. In the single-game divisional championship round, the Rox defeated the Huskies and the Kingfish beat the Mallards.

The championship series was a best-of-three set between the Kingfish and the Rox. The Kingfish swept the Rox and claimed their first NWL title.

=== Individual achievements ===
Mason McCoy of the La Crosse Loggers was named 2015 NWL Most Valuable Player. Across 71 games, he led the league in batting average (.367), hits (112), and runs scored (79). His hits and runs scored set new NWL records that remain as such, as of the end of the 2026 season.

Alex Hermeling of the Battle Creek Bombers was named 2015 NWL Pitcher of the Year. He appeared in 9 games (53.2 innings), maintaining a 1.17 ERA while striking out 52 batters and only walking 12. In mid-summer, Hermeling signed with the Los Angeles Dodgers.

Others who had excellent 2015 NWL seasons include Daulton Varsho, Ernie Clement, Luke Raley, Cal Stevenson, Miles Mastrobuoni, and Tony Gonsolin. Gonsolin, playing as an outfielder for the Mallards at age 21, batted .316 with a .913 OPS, 11 home runs, and 16 stolen bases.

In the 2015 Major League Baseball draft, 189 former NWL players were selected by MLB teams. Alex Young was the highest-selected alum, going to the Arizona Diamondbacks with the 43rd pick. Young had played for the Lakeshore Chinooks in 2013. Other notable alums selected that year include Harrison Bader (Chinooks, '13), Andrew Stevenson (Chinooks, '13), and Paul DeJong (Woodchucks, '14).

== Standings and playoffs ==
North Division
Pos	Team	W	L	Pct.
1	x – St. Cloud Rox	49	23	.681
2	x – Willmar Stingers	47	24	.662
3	x – Duluth Huskies	40	32	.556
4	x – Rochester Honkers	39	33	.542
5	Thunder Bay Border Cats	33	38	.465
6	Mankato MoonDogs	33	39	.458
7	Waterloo Bucks	31	41	.431
8	Alexandria Blue Anchors	30	42	.417
9	Eau Claire Express	29	42	.408

South Division
Pos	Team	W	L	Pct.
1	x – Kenosha Kingfish	48	24	.667
2	x – Madison Mallards	43	28	.606
3	x – Green Bay Bullfrogs	41	30	.577
4	x – La Crosse Loggers	40	31	.563
5	Lakeshore Chinooks	36	36	.500
6	Wisconsin Rapids Rafters	33	35	.485
7	Battle Creek Bombers	27	44	.380
8	Wisconsin Woodchucks	24	47	.338
9	Kalamazoo Growlers	17	55	.236

- x – Qualified for playoffs based on either best record (first or second half of season) or as a wildcard due to overall record.

=== Playoff bracket ===
Wildcard round
St. Cloud
Rochester
Duluth
Willmar
↑ North Division ↓ South Division
Kenosha
La Crosse
Madison
Green Bay

Division Championship
St. Cloud
Duluth
Kenosha
Madison

League Championship series
Kenosha
St. Cloud

== Statistical leaders ==
Qualified hitters must have minimum of 71 at-bats per season.

=== Hitting ===
Stat	Player	Team	Total
H	Mason McCoy	Loggers	112
HR	Luke Raley	Chinooks	14
RBI	Luke Raley, Eric Filia	Chinooks, Kingfish	55 (tie)
AVG	Mason McCoy	Loggers	.367
OPS	Max Ponzurick	Rafters	1.048
SB	Sean Beesley	Stingers	34

=== Pitching ===
Stat	Player	Team	Total
W	Zach Strecker, Jake Johansmeier	Stingers, Rafters	7 (tie)
SO	Grant Hamilton	MoonDogs	73
SV	Trevor Charpie	Rox	11

== All-Star selections ==
=== Mid-season All-Star Game ===
The 2015 NWL mid-season All-Star Game was played on 7/21/15 at historic Witter Field in Wisconsin Rapids, Wisconsin. The following players were selected to participate in the All-Star game.

North Division

Hitters
Position	Player	Team
C	Daulton Varsho	Express
C	Dominic Miroglio	Huskies
1B	Ricky Sanchez	Blue Anchors
2B	Steve Sada	Blue Anchors
3B	Carter McEachern	Border Cats
3B	Luke Stratman	Bucks
SS	Zach McKinstry	Bucks
SS	Matt McLaughlin	Huskies
SS	Paul Panaccione	MoonDogs
OF	Dan Motl	Stingers
OF	Storm Wilson	Stingers
OF	Josh Merrigan	Blue Anchors
OF	Jared James	Border Cats
OF	Cal Stevenson	Huskies

Pitchers
Position	Player	Team
P	Austin Carpenter	Huskies
P	Bo Hellquist	Huskies
P	Grant Hamilton	MoonDogs
P	Rickey Ramirez	MoonDogs
P	Jayson Yano	Honkers
P	Reese Gregory	Rox
P	Trevor Charpie	Rox
P	Greg Weissert	Border Cats
P	Brian Drapeau	Bucks
P	Brady Anderson	Stingers
P	Dakota Belter	Stingers
P	Austin Warner	MoonDogs

South Division

Hitters
Position	Player	Team
C	Jean Ramirez	Mallards
C	Jason Scholl	Kingfish
C	Albee Weiss	Woodchucks
1B	Ryan Donovan	Bullfrogs
2B	Jordan Zimmerman	Loggers
2B	Alex Borglin	Kingfish
3B	Hunter Alexander	Kingfish
3B	Brock Carpenter	Rafters
SS	Mason McCoy	Loggers
OF	Eric Filia	Kingfish
OF	Lucas Raley	Chinooks
OF	Tony Gonsolin	Mallards
OF	Max Ponzurick	Woodchucks
OF	Logan Regnier	Mallards

Pitchers
Position	Player	Team
P	Alex Hermeling	Bombers
P	Garrett Harrison	Bullfrogs
P	Josh Serio	Kingfish
P	Ty Provencher	Loggers
P	Lake Bachar	Chinooks
P	Mike Kaelin	Mallards
P	Jeremy Graf	Bullfrogs
P	Vice Arobio	Mallards
P	Robert Zeigler	Woodchucks
P	Jack Riley	Rafters
P	P.J. Schuster	Kingfish
P	Ryan Orr	Kingfish
P	Shane Bryant	Growlers

== NWL alumni in MLB ==
=== MLB players who played in the NWL in 2015 ===
The following is a list of players who appeared in the NWL during the 2015 season, en route to a future appearance/career in MLB.

Name	2015 NWL team
Tony Gonsolin	Madison Mallards
Rico Garcia	Kenosha Kingfish
Daulton Varsho	Eau Claire Express
Sterling Sharp	Madison Mallards
Kyle Nelson	La Crosse Loggers
Zach McKinstry	Waterloo Bucks
Jared Oliva	Wisconsin Woodchucks
Zach Pop	St. Cloud Rox
Luke Raley	Lakeshore Chinooks
Zac Lowther	Lakeshore Chinooks
Lucas Gilbreath	St. Cloud Rox
Riley Adams	La Crosse Loggers
Griffin Jax	Eau Claire Express
Ernie Clement	Wisconsin Rapids Rafters
Greg Deichmann	Lakeshore Chinooks
Mark Kolozsvary	Lakeshore Chinooks
Penn Murfee	Thunder Bay Border Cats
Mark Contreras	Rochester Honkers
Brandon Hughes	Kalamazoo Growlers
Michael Papierski	Eau Claire Express
Jonah Bride	Waterloo Bucks
Matthew Batten	Thunder Bay Border Cats
Erich Uelmen	Eau Claire Express
Terrin Vavra	Duluth Huskies
Charles Leblanc	Kalamazoo Growlers
Cal Stevenson	Duluth Huskies
Greg Weissert	Thunder Bay Border Cats
Miles Mastrobuoni	Rochester Honkers
Jesse Scholtens	Lakeshore Chinooks
Zach Muckenhirn	Alexandria Blue Anchors
Taylor Kohlwey	Wisconsin Woodchucks
Mason McCoy	La Crosse Loggers
Irving Lopez	Eau Claire Express
Michael Petersen	Battle Creek Bombers
Lake Bachar	Lakeshore Chinooks
Brian Keller	Lakeshore Chinooks
Jack Ralston	La Crosse Loggers

=== Alums with 2015 MLB debuts ===
The following is a list of NWL alums who made their Major League Baseball debuts in the 2015 MLB season.

Name	MLB debut	Debut team	Former NWL team(s)	Season(s) in NWL
J.R. Graham	4/6	Twins	Mallards	2009-10
Tyler Olson	4/7	Mariners	Bullfrogs	2012
Mark Canha	4/8	Athletics	River Bats	2008
A.J. Schugel	4/12	Diamondbacks	Border Cats	2009-10
Andrew McKirahan	4/12	Braves	Loggers	2009
Matt Grace	4/22	Nationals	Beetles	2008
Austin Barnes	5/24	Dodgers	River Bats	2010
Pat Venditte	6/5	Athletics	Woodchucks	2007
Scott Schebler	6/5	Dodgers	Bullfrogs	2010
Jon Moscot	6/5	Reds	Woodchucks	2010
Dan Burawa	6/21	Yankees	Mallards	2009
Ryan Lollis	7/4	Giants	Huskies	2006
Nick Goody	7/30	Yankees	MoonDogs	2011
Chris Reed	8/1	Marlins	Woodchucks	2009
Scott McGough	8/20	Marlins	Honkers	2009
Jerad Eickhoff	8/21	Phillies	Woodchucks	2010
John Hicks	8/29	Mariners	Mallards	2009
Scott Alexander	9/2	Royals	Loggers	2008
Rocky Gale	9/6	Padres	Bullfrogs	2008
Nevin Ashley	9/9	Brewers	Express	2006
Cody Decker	9/14	Padres	Huskies, MoonDogs	2006, 2007
Daniel Winkler	9/21	Braves	Honkers	2010
Trevor Brown	9/15	Giants	Loggers	2011

=== Awards and highlights ===
NWL alums selected the 2015 MLB All-Star Game:

- Brandon Crawford (Mankato MoonDogs, 2005)
- Mark Melancon (Duluth Huskies, 2004)
- Chris Sale (La Crosse Loggers, 2008)
- Max Scherzer (La Crosse Loggers, 2004)

NWL alums awarded with a 2015 Gold Glove:

- Kole Calhoun (Eau Claire Express, 2007-09)
- Brandon Crawford (Mankato MoonDogs, 2005)

NWL alums awarded with a 2015 Silver Slugger:

- Brandon Crawford (Mankato MoonDogs, 2005)

NWL alums who were members of the World Series-winning Kansas City Royals:

- Ben Zobrist (Wisconsin Woodchucks, 2003)

== See also ==
- 2015 Major League Baseball season
