= Wade Stadium =

Baseball field in Duluth, Minnesota

- The Wade
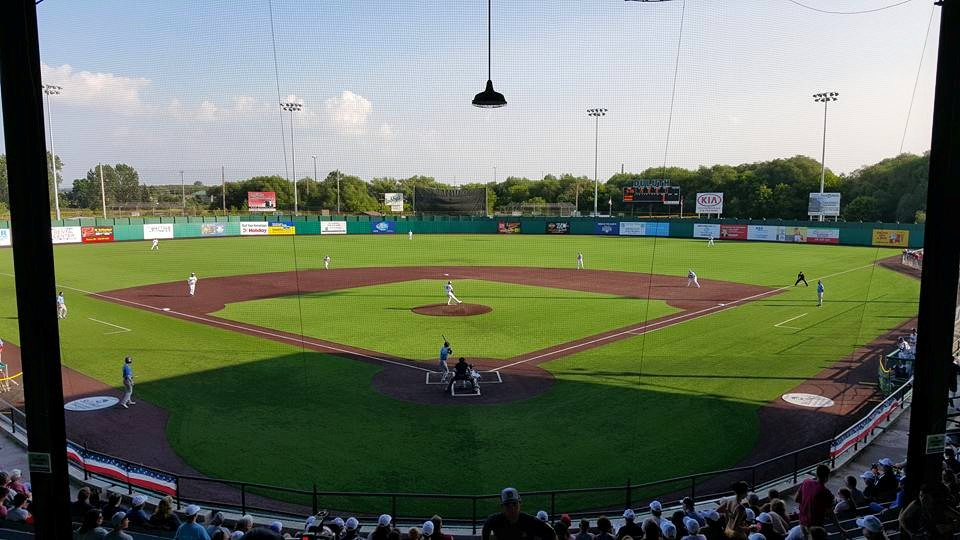
- Interactive map of Wade Stadium
- Full name: Frank Wade Municipal Stadium
- Former names: Duluth All-Sports Municipal Stadium (1941–1954)
- Location: 101 N. 35th Ave West, Duluth, Minnesota 55807
- Coordinates: 46°45′16″N 92°8′37″W
- Owner: City of Duluth
- Capacity: 4,200
- Surface: Astro turf
- Field size: Left Field – 340 ft (105 m); Center Field – 380 ft (116 m); Right Field – 340 ft (104 m)
- Public transit: Duluth Transit Authority

Construction
- Built: 1940-41
- Opened: July 16, 1941
- Renovated: August 15, 2014
- Cost: 163,232 USD (original budget); 230,880 USD (final cost) 2,200,000 USD (2014 Renovation)
- Architects: Sullivan & Orrfalt and Philip L.H. Burrell
- General contractor: Works Progress Administration

Tenants
- Duluth Dukes (NL) 1941–1942; 1946–1955; Duluth–Superior Dukes (NL) 1956–1970; Duluth–Superior Dukes (NL) 1993–2002; Duluth Huskies (NWL) 2003–present

Wade Stadium is a baseball park located near the intersection of Grand Avenue and 34th Avenue West in the West Duluth neighborhood of Duluth, Minnesota. The stadium was built in 1941 and holds 4,200 people. It is the home of the Duluth Huskies of the Northwoods League and The College of St. Scholastica baseball team who have won 19 straight Upper Midwest Athletic Conference (UMAC) regular season and 18 straight post-season titles. "The Wade", as it is sometimes called by fans, was also the home of the Duluth–Superior Dukes of the reincarnated Northern League from 1993 until 2002, and the home of Dukes of the original Northern League from 1941 until 1970. One of a dying breed of Works Progress Administration (WPA) constructed stadiums, "The Wade" is noted for its short distances (especially from home plate to center field), its high fences, and the cool, damp weather generated by nearby Lake Superior.

== History ==
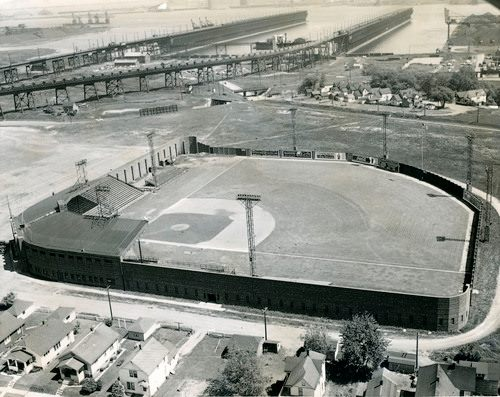
Wade Stadium

During the Great Depression, the U.S. federal government used the WPA to fund projects to boost employment. One of these projects was the removal of the brick roadbed from Grand Avenue, which was then paved with asphalt. During the fall of 1940, road crews removed 381,000 bricks from the surface of Grand Avenue. Another WPA crew used these bricks to build Wade Stadium.

The decision to build Wade Stadium originated with a 1938 study commissioned by Walter Chantigney, chairman of Duluth's Citywide All-Sports committee. The study found that the Duluth Duke's existing stadium, Athletic Park, was obsolete. According to the study:

Duluth does not have a suitable stadium for professional baseball. The present athletic park, privately owned and used by Duluth's professional team, has too small a capacity, the seats are unsuitable, the sanitary facilities are seriously inadequate and the playing field is smaller than regulation size. ...

Chantigney gathered more than 7,500 signatures to place a construction bond measure on the November, 1938, ballot. After voters approved the bond measure, money was gathered over the next two years from bond sales, the state of Minnesota, and the WPA. The site selected for the new stadium was located directly across Grand Avenue from Athletic Park.

A construction budget totaling $163,232 was set. But, due to cost overruns, the final cost of the stadium was $230,880. During construction, the project received several bailouts. One bailout came from Duluth's newly elected mayor, Edward H. Hatch, who purchased the materials needed to finish construction.

The stadium's original name was Duluth All-Sports Municipal Stadium. It was renamed Wade Municipal Stadium in 1954 in honor of former Duluth Dukes owner Frank Wade, who died in 1953.

In 1971, the ABC News-produced television show Discovery aired an episode called Part Way to the Majors, which chronicled the 1970 Dukes as well as other Northern League teams. Wade Stadium was featured prominently in that special, showing a glimpse of the final year of affiliated baseball at the Wade.

=== Tenancy ===
The Duluth Dukes played their first game in the new stadium on July 16, 1941. Their first opponent was their local rival, the Superior Blues. When the Blues folded in 1955, the Dukes (known as the White Sox during the 1956–59 seasons) became the Duluth–Superior Dukes. The original Dukes played in Wade Stadium from 1941 through the 1970 season. The only break came during the 1943–45 seasons when the Northern League suspended play due to World War II. The stadium was the home of three teams in the Twin Ports League, the only Class E league in the history of baseball, in 1943.

When television began carrying Major League Baseball games in the 1950s, minor league baseball suffered from a drop in advertising revenue. Many of the smaller minor leagues around the country folded. The Northern League became one of these casualties when it was announced prior to the 1971 season that it was ceasing operations. After the original Northern League disbanded, the stadium was rarely used over the next twelve years. It was being threatened with demolition when the newly created Northern League awarded Duluth a franchise in 1993. The Stadium has had a tenant every year since. When the Dukes moved out of the Stadium in 2002, the void was filled almost immediately by the Huskies.
