= Duluth–Superior Dukes =

Defunct minor league baseball team (1993–2002)

Duluth-Superior Dukes
- Logo

Information
- League: Northern League
- Location: Duluth, Minnesota
- Ballpark: Wade Stadium
- Founded: 1993
- League championships: 1997 (League); 2000 (Central)
- Colours: Purple, silver, black, white

The Duluth–Superior Dukes were a professional baseball team based in Duluth, Minnesota. The Dukes were a charter member of the modern Northern League, which started play in 1993. The Dukes played their home games at Wade Stadium. After the 2002 season, the Dukes were moved to Kansas City where they were renamed the T-Bones.

== History ==
The Duluth–Superior Dukes were a re-incarnation of previous minor league teams based in the Twin Ports. The Duluth Dukes and Superior Blues both played in earlier versions of the Northern League, with the two teams merging after the 1955 season. Initially the team was called the White Sox, with the team becoming the Duluth-Superior Dukes in 1960. The team would fold after the 1970 season, with the league itself folding one year later.

The modern version of the Northern League was founded by Miles Wolff Jr. as a minor professional independent baseball league. This means the league was not affiliated with Major League Baseball or the organized minor leagues. The Dukes became one of six original teams that began play in the 1993 season, along with the St. Paul Saints, the Sioux Falls Canaries, the Sioux City Explorers, the Thunder Bay Whiskey Jacks and the Rochester Aces (who moved after one season and become the Winnipeg Goldeyes). The team would play its home games at Wade Stadium, which had been the home to the previous versions of the Dukes/White Sox since it was completed in 1941. Mal Fichman was named the team's first manager.

== Early struggles ==
The league employed a split season, with the winner of each half making the playoffs. This was done so that teams would have a chance to overcome a bad start and could remain in playoff contention later into the season. However, this system did not help the Dukes, as they were perennial cellar dwellers early on. For only one half during the first three seasons did the Dukes manage to avoid finishing in last place in the six team league (they finished fifth during the first half in 1995).

Despite the struggles of the team, there were a couple of individual highlights. Catcher/outfielder Jeff Grotewold, who was on the Dukes roster in 1994 and had played for the Philadelphia Phillies in 1992, would return to the majors in 1995 with the Kansas City Royals. In 1995, catcher Pete Kuld (acquired in a mid-season trade with Thunder Bay) would go on to lead the league in home runs with 24.

The 1996 season saw changes for the league (it split into two divisions with four teams each) as well as a turn around for the team. With new manager George Mitterwald, the Dukes would post a 21–21 record in the first half, a game and a half behind East Division winner St. Paul. The playoff race in the second half would go down to the final days of the season with the Dukes battling the Madison Black Wolf (who, along with the Fargo-Moorhead RedHawks, joined the league as expansion teams for the 1996 season). Coming into the game with identical second half records, Madison would defeat the Dukes in the final game of the season to claim a playoff spot and end the Dukes season.

== Championship season ==
With Mitterwald returning as manager for the 1997 season, along with a number of players, the team was expected to contend. However, the team struggled in the first half and finished six and half games behind St. Paul, who finished first in the East Division. However, the Dukes were much improved in the second half of the season, finishing with a 22–20 record, their first winning half in team history. So despite an overall record below .500, the Dukes claimed a playoff berth by finishing first in the East Division for the second half. The team was powered by Mike Meggers (acquired in a mid-season trade with Winnipeg), who would lead the league with 32 home runs. The pitching staff was led by starter Jeremy McGarity and closer Emiliano Giron.

In the playoffs, they would meet St. Paul. The Dukes won the series 3 games to 2 to claim the Eastern Division title. They then moved on to face the Western Division winner, the Winnipeg Goldeyes. With the series tied at 2, the Dukes would win the deciding game 3–1 in front of a sold-out Wade Stadium to claim the league championship. The championship was especially rewarding for McGarity, infielders Al Barsoom and first baseman Jeff Jensen. Each were in their third season and had been a part of the struggles the team had been through previously.

League championship series MVP Allen Halley, who was the winning pitcher in the deciding game against Winnipeg, died from a seizure in March 1998. It had been expected that Halley would have returned to the team for the 1998 season.

== Ila Borders ==
History was made in the Northern League in 1997 when the St. Paul Saints signed Ila Borders, who became one of the first women to pitch in men's professional baseball. After a few outings with the Saints, Borders was traded to the Dukes about a month into the season. Borders would see limited action during that season, but she would be a member of the championship team. She returned to the Dukes for the 1998 season. After not pitching much in the first half of the season, Borders would become the first woman to start a men's professional baseball game on July 7, 1998. On July 24, she recorded her first and only win of the season, another first for a woman. She again returned to the Dukes for the 1999 season, but the new manager decreased her playing time. She requested a trade, which was granted, with the Dukes sending her to the Madison Black Wolf.

== Second playoff berth ==
The 1998 and 1999 seasons saw a return to losing for the Dukes, as they missed out on the playoffs both seasons. However, the 2000 season saw a resurgence. Under new manager Benny Castillo, the Dukes enjoyed one of their best seasons. The team just missed claiming the first half title in the East division, finishing one and half games behind St. Paul. This season, much like in 1996, would be a battle down the stretch between the Dukes and Madison. Finishing with identical second half records, the two teams would meet in a one-game playoff to determine who would make the playoffs. After losing to Madison in 1996, the Dukes would not let history repeat itself, as they beat the Black Wolf to claim their second ever playoff berth.

First baseman Anthony "Big Papa" Lewis (in his third season with the team), designated hitter Tony Mitchell, and outfielder Jim Rushford powered the offense. They would lead the team with 33, 26, and 12 home runs respectively. The pitching staff was led by Chris Swaitkiewicz, who led the team with 11 wins.

The team went on a roll through the first two rounds of the playoffs, beating St. Paul (3 games to 1) to claim the Eastern Division title and Fargo-Moorhead (3 games to 0) to claim the Central Championship. However, due to the recent merger between the Northern League and the Northeast League the year before, there was an extra round of playoffs to be played. The Dukes would be swept by Adirondack 3 games to 0, ending their season.

Two players from this team would go on to make appearances in Major League Baseball. After the season, Rushford was signed to a contract by the Milwaukee Brewers organization and would go on to play 23 games with the Brewers at the end of the 2002 season. Pitcher Terry Pearson would sign with the Detroit Tigers organization and would pitch in four games during the 2002 season.

== Final seasons ==
The turn of the century brought numerous changes to the league, as teams left struggling markets and moved to more prosperous ones. After the 1998 season, Thunder Bay moved to the Chicago area and became the Schaumburg Flyers, while the Black Wolf left Madison after the 2000 season and became the Lincoln Saltdogs. 2002 also saw further expansion into the Chicago market, with the addition of the Gary SouthShore RailCats and the Joliet JackHammers.

These changes left the Dukes near the bottom of the league in attendance, with the team averaging a league low 1209 fans per game for the 2002 season. Also, the team failed to build off the success of the 2000 season and struggled on the field in 2001 and 2002, especially in the second half. These factors combined led to rumors that owner John Ehlert would move the team. Despite assurances he would keep the team in Duluth, Ehlert announced in September 2002 that the team would re-locate and become the Kansas City T-Bones.

However, Wade Stadium and Duluth would not remain without a team for long. The Northwoods League, a collegiate summer baseball league, immediately granted Duluth a team to fill the void left by the Dukes. This team would be called the Duluth Huskies and began play in the 2003 season.

== Seasonal record ==
| Season | Division | W – L (1st Half) | GB / Finish (1st Half) | W – L (2nd Half) | GB / Finish (2nd Half) | W – L (Overall) | Playoffs | Manager |
|---|---|---|---|---|---|---|---|---|
| 1993 | None | 15 – 21 | 6 / 6th | 16 – 20 | 7 / 6th | 31 – 41 | None | Mal Fichman |
| 1994 | None | 8 – 32 | 19 / 6th | 11 – 28 | 15.5 / 6th | 19 – 60 | None | Howie Bedell |
| 1995 | None | 16 – 26 | 10 / 5th | 15 – 27 | 12 / 6th | 31 – 53 | None | Tommy Thompson |
| 1996 | East | 21 – 21 | 1.5 / 3rd | 21 – 21 | 1 / 3rd | 42 – 42 | None | George Mitterwald |
| 1997 | East | 17 – 24 | 6.5 / 3rd | 22 – 20 | 1st | 39 – 44 | Won East Division Title (Saint Paul) 3–2; Won League Championship (Winnipeg) 3-2 | George Mitterwald |
| 1998 | East | 12 – 30 | 9.5 / 4th | 17 – 26 | 3 / 3rd | 29 – 56 | None | George Mitterwald |
| 1999 | East | 18 – 24 | 0.5 / 2nd | 17 – 25 | 7.5 / 4th | 35 – 49 | None | Larry See |
| 2000 | East | 20 – 22 | 1.5 / 2nd | 23 – 21 | 1st | 43 – 43 | Won East Division Title (Saint Paul) 3–1; Won Central Championship (Fargo-Moorhead) 3-0; Lost League Championship (Adirondack) 0-3 | Benny Castillo |
| 2001 | East | 21 – 24 | 8 / 2nd | 13 – 32 | 10 / 4th | 34 – 56 | None | Ed Nottle |
| 2002 | North | 24 – 21 | 4 / 3rd | 12 – 33 | 16 / 5th | 36 – 54 | None | Al Gallagher |

League notes:
1993–1995: Northern League founded as a six team league with no divisions: two playoff teams (GB and Finish reflects place in league)
1996–1998: League expands to eight teams with two divisions of four teams: four playoff teams (GB and Finish reflects place in division)
1999–2000: Merger with Northeast League to form a sixteen team league (Eight in the Central and Eight in the East) with four divisions of four teams: eight playoff teams (GB and Finish reflects place in division)
2001: East contracted two teams: Eight teams (four team divisions) remain in the Central: eight playoff teams (GB and Finish reflects place in division)
2002: League expands to eighteen teams: Central expands to ten teams with two divisions of five teams: eight playoff teams (GB and Finish reflects place in division)

== Major League players ==
Former Major League players who appeared with the Dukes:

- OF Dana Williams (1993)
- P Wayne Rosenthal (1993)
- OF/C Jeff Grotewold (1994)
- P Tom Gilles (1994)
- C Greg O'Halloran (1995)
- OF Bob Zupcic (1995)
- OF Greg Briley (1996–1997)
- 3B Darren Reed (1996)
- P Pat Ahearne (1996)
- OF Jerald Clark (1997)
- P Rich Scheid (1997)
- P Randy Tomlin (1997)
- 1B Ozzie Canseco (1998)
- OF Pat Howell (1999)
- C Sean Mulligan (1999)
- 1B Larry See (1999)
- DH Greg Jelks (2001)
- OF Brent Bowers (2001)
- OF Derrick Gibson (2002)
- OF Terry Jones (2002)

Players who appeared in Major League Baseball after playing for the Dukes:

- OF/C Jeff Grotewold (1994)
- OF Jim Rushford (2000)
- P Terry Pearson (2000)

Note: years in parentheses are when they appeared for the Dukes

== League leaders/awards ==
League leaders

1995:

- Home runs: Pete Kuld, 24 (spent half season with Thunder Bay)

1996:

- Wins: Jeremy McGarity, 12

1997:

- Home runs: Mike Meggers, 32 (spent half season with Winnipeg)
- Runs batted In: Mike Meggers, 99 (spent half season with Winnipeg)
- Strikeouts: Jeremy McGarity, 142

1999:

- Runs scored: Brandon Evans, 73

2000:

- Batting average: Anthony Lewis, .365 (Central Leader Only)
- Hits: Anthony Lewis, 123
- Home runs: Anthony Lewis, 33
- Runs batted in: Anthony Lewis, 89
- Runs scored: Anthony Lewis, 88
- Strikeouts: Jordan Romero, 123

Players selected to post-season All-Star Team

1995:

- 2B Tommy Houk

1996:

- OF AJ Johnson

1997:

- OF Mike Meggers
- 3B Jason Shanahan

1999:

- OF Bryan Warner

2000

- 1B Anthony Lewis
- OF Jim Rushford
- DH Tony Mitchell

Players selected to mid-season All-Star Game

1993–1996

- No Game

1997:

- OF Mike Meggers
- 3B Jason Shanahan
- C Johnny Cardenas
- P Emiliano Giron
- P Jamison Nuttle

1998:

- 1B Ozzie Canseco
- P Chris DeWitt
- P Emiliano Giron
- Man George Mitterwald

1999

- OF Bryan Warner

2000:

- 1B Anthony Lewis
- OF Jim Rushford

2001:

- P Dan Guehne

2002:

- P Travis Thompson

League Awards:

1997:

- Manager of the Year: George Mitterwald
- Most Valuable Player: Mike Meggers

2000:

- Central Manager of the Year: Benny Castillo
- Central Player of the Year: Anthony Lewis
- Central Newcomer of the Year: Jim Rushford
