= Willmar Stingers =

- Logo

Information
- League: Northwoods League (Great Plains West Division)
- Location: Willmar, Minnesota
- Ballpark: Bill Taunton Stadium
- Founded: 2010
- League championships: 0
- Division championships: 0
- Colors: Black, yellow, white
- Mascot: Barry the bear
- Ownership: Ryan Voz and Marc Jerzak
- General manager: Keaton Worley
- Manager: Freddy Smith
- Media: West Central Tribune
- Website: willmarstingers.com

The Willmar Stingers are a collegiate summer league baseball team of the Northwoods League. They are located in Willmar, Minnesota, and play their home games at Bill Taunton Stadium. The Stingers and other collegiate summer leagues and teams exist to give top college players a professional-like experience without affecting NCAA eligibility.

== History ==
The Stingers played their inaugural season in 2010, entering the league as an expansion team alongside the Wisconsin Rapids Rafters. On June 3, 2010, the franchise's first ever hit and run were recorded by former Willmar Cardinal and current Minnesota Twins minor league coach Jordan Smith.

The Stingers were honored with the Northwoods League Organization of the Year Award in 2010. Stingers co-owner Marc Jerzak credited "Stingers fans, host families, sponsors and city officials" for "[making] the 2010 Inaugural season a memorable one."

Although the Stingers have yet to win a championship, fans in Willmar have witnessed excellent players and performances over the years. In 2024, outfielder Andrew Sojka was named Northwoods League Player of the Year after batting .398 with 22 home runs, 22 doubles, five triples, and 73 RBI. Sojka also set the all-time Northwoods League home run record with 37 homers over the course of three seasons in the league. Additionally, several Stingers have gone on to play in Major League Baseball, in including All-Star pitcher Louis Varland and American League Pitcher of the Month Noah Cameron.

== Seasons ==
Season	Manager	Record	Win %	League	Division	GB	Post-season record	Post-season win %	Post-season result	Notes
2010	Matt Hollod	39–31	.557	T–5th	2nd	2.0	0–0	.000	Did not qualify	Inaugural Season
2011	Matt Hollod	39–31	.557	5th	3rd	5.5	0–0	.000	Did not qualify	
2012	Matt Hollod	41–28	.594	4th	2nd	1.0	1–2	.333	Lost North Division Championship (Mankato)	
2013	Matt Hollod	41–29	.586	T–5th	3rd	10.0	0–0	.000	Did not qualify	
2014	Drew Saberhagen	46–26	.639	2nd	1st	–	1–2	.333	Lost North Division Championship (Mankato)	
2015	Drew Saberhagen	47–24	.662	3rd	2nd	1.5	0–1	.000	Lost First Round (Duluth)	
2016	Matt Passauer	41–31	.569	6th	4th	7.5	0–1	.000	Lost First Round (St. Cloud)	
2017	Eric Vazquez	41–31	.569	5th	3rd	3.0	0–1	.000	Lost First Round (St. Cloud)	
2018	Bo Henning	48–24	.667	2nd	1st	–	1–1	.500	Won First Round (Mankato); Lost North Division Championship (Duluth)	
2019	Bo Henning	40–32	.556	7th	2nd	4.0	2–1	.667	Won Great Plains West Division Championship (St. Cloud); Lost Great Plains Division Championship (Eau Claire)	
2020	Bo Henning	22–20	.524	9th	3rd	6.5	0–0	.000	Did not qualify	
2021	Al Leyva	32–36	.471	11th	3rd	18.0	0–0	.000	Did not qualify	
2022	Freddy Smith	48–20	.706	3rd	2nd	2.0	2–1	.667	Won Great Plains West Division Championship (St. Cloud); Lost Great Plains Division Championship (Duluth)	
2023	Freddy Smith	51–16	.761	1st	1st	–	0–2	.000	Lost Great Plains West Division Championship (St. Cloud)	
2024	Freddy Smith	44–26	.629	4th	1st	–	1–2	.333	Lost Great Plains West Division Championship (St. Cloud)	
2026	Nate Johnson	38–33	.535	T–11th	4th	10.0	0–0	.000	Did not qualify	
2026	Freddy Smith	37–33	.529	T-10th	2nd	5.5	1–2	.333	Lost Great Plains West Division Championship (St. Cloud)	
Totals		695–471	.596				9–16	.360		

== Roster ==
Willmar Stingers roster
Active roster		Coaching staff
Pitchers: 15 Parker Barraza; 38 Koen Barton; 12 Taggert Cameron; 39 Logan Freche; 32 Parker Grant; 44 Riley Hasenstab; 5 Jordan Jackson; 18 Eli Kokenge; 19 Matthew MacGregor; 1 Chaz McRoberts; 16 Wyatt Mosley; 40 Brady Nelson; 9 Hunter VaDeer; 42 Jamie Vicens; 30 Trey Zaffiro	Catchers: 14 Jayton Greer; 10 Noah Massey; 46 Holtt Williams; Infielders: 0 David Estrada; 6 Kyle Panganiban; 4 Kyler Proctor; 17 Merrick Rapoza; 13 Nate Stiveson; 24 Tyler Stull; 29 Enrico Veach; Outfielders: 27 Max Buettenback; 2 Kai Gonzaga; 35 Cru Huenfeld; 31 Cooper Wood; 25 Brooks Wright	Manager: -- Freddy Smith; Coaches: TBD; Disabled list; ‡ Inactive list; § Suspended list; updated June 12, 2026

== Notable alumni ==
The following is a list of formers Stingers to have appeared in Major League Baseball.

Name	Year(s) with Stingers	MLB debut	MLB accolades
Tanner Banks	2011-12	4/10/2022	
Jacob Barnes	2010	6/3/2016	
Brett Bateman	2021-22	8/7/2026	
Anthony Bemboom	2010-11	5/12/2019	
Steven Brault	2012-13	7/5/2016	
Noah Cameron	2020	4/30/2025	AL Pitcher of the Month (Sept. 2026)
Hunter Dozier	2012	9/12/2016	
John Klein	2021-22	5/2/2026	
Brooks Lee	2020	7/3/2024	
Kyle Manzardo	2020	5/6/2024	
Nick Mears	2017-18	8/8/2020	
Joey Ortiz	2018	4/27/2023	World Series Champion (2026)
Colin Poche	2013	6/8/2019	
Phoenix Sanders	2014	4/14/2022	
Ty Tice	2016	4/9/2021	
Gus Varland	2017	3/30/2023	
Louis Varland	2017-18	9/7/2022	All-Star, AL Reliever of the Year (2026)
Eric Yang	2018	7/31/2024	
