= Duluth Dukes =

- 1935–1955; (1935–1942, 1946–1955); Duluth, Minnesota

Minor league affiliations
- Previous classes: C (1941–1942, 1946–1955); D (1935–1940)
- League: Northern League

Major league affiliations
- Previous teams: Cincinnati Redlegs (1954–1955); St. Louis Cardinals (1937–1942, 1946–1950)

Minor league titles
- League titles: 1937

Team data
- Previous names: Duluth Dukes (1935–1942, 1946–1955); Duluth White Sox (1934)
- Previous parks: Wade Stadium (1941–1942, 1946–1955); Athletic Park (1935–1940)

The Duluth Dukes was the name of an American minor league baseball franchise that represented Duluth, Minnesota in the Northern League from 1935 to 1942 and 1946 to 1955. In addition, a separate edition of the Dukes was one of four franchises in the short-lived Twin Ports League, a "Class E" minor league that played for six weeks during the 1943 season. The Dukes played at Athletic Park from 1935 to 1940. Beginning in 1941, the team played its home games at Wade Stadium.

== History ==
Duluth was represented in the Northwestern League by the Duluth Freezers (1886, 1887) and the Western Association by the Duluth Whalebacks (1891). The Duluth White Sox began play in 1903, known as the "Cardinals" in their first season before becoming the "White Sox." The White Sox were in the Northern League (1903–1905; 1908; 1913–1916; 1934), as well as the Northern-Copper Country League (1906–1907), Minnesota–Wisconsin League (1909–1911), and the Central International League (1912).

In 1936, the Dukes affiliated with the St. Louis Cardinals and joined the vast Redbird farm system created by general manager Branch Rickey. The Dukes would be a Cardinal affiliate through 1950 (although the Northern League team and the league itself suspended operations from 1943–1945 due to World War II).

When the Cardinal affiliation ended, the Dukes continued in the Northern League without a Major League parent from 1951–1953. The franchise then signed a working agreement with the Cincinnati Redlegs for 1954–1955.

In 1956, the Dukes were merged with the rival Superior Blues from neighboring Superior, Wisconsin, and played at Wade Municipal Stadium as the Duluth–Superior White Sox from 1956–1959. The "Dukes" name was restored to the Duluth-Superior franchise in 1960.

The 1943 Dukes played 19 games in the Twin Ports League, winning nine. The league folded on July 13.

An independent Northern League Duluth–Superior Dukes club existed from 1993 to 2002.

== 1948 bus accident ==
On July 24, 1948, the Dukes endured one of the worst transit accidents in minor league history. On Highway 36 near St. Paul, Minnesota, the team's bus, driven by manager George Treadwell, collided head-on with a truck. Treadwell, age 42, and four of his players — pitcher Donald Schuchmann, 20; infielder Steve Lazar, 23; and outfielders Gerald "Peanuts" Peterson, 23, and Gilbert Tribl, 19 — were killed, as was the driver of the truck. Thirteen Duluth players were injured, including future Major League manager and coach Mel McGaha. The disaster was the second-worst in baseball history, following two years and one month after the June 24, 1946, bus accident that killed nine members of the Spokane Indians. It left Duluth with one uninjured player, pitcher Sam Hunter, who was not aboard the bus at the time of the crash. The Dukes completed the season with new players and a manager supplied by the Cardinals organization, and $80,000 was raised in contributions to aid the victims' families and survivors.

== Major League players ==
- 1935 — Wally Gilbert, Les Rock
- 1936 — Blix Donnelly, Wally Gilbert, Fred Martin, Rip Wade
- 1937 — Marv Felderman, Bill Hart, Fred Martin
- 1938 — Marv Felderman
- 1939 — None
- 1940 — Glenn Crawford
- 1941 — Glenn Crawford, Eddie Malone
- 1942 — Eddie Malone, Wayne McLeland
- 1946 — Bob Habenicht, Bert Shepard
- 1947 — Cloyd Boyer
- 1948 — Mel McGaha
- 1949 — None
- 1950 — None
- 1951 — Hank Aguirre, Orie Arntzen, Joe Caffie, Hal Woodeshick
- 1952 — Joe Caffie
- 1953 — Steve Gerkin
- 1954 — Danny Litwhiler
- 1955 — Red Treadway

Note: None of the Duluth Dukes of the 1943 Twin Ports League reached the major leagues.

== See also ==
- Duluth–Superior Dukes (1960–1970 team)
- Duluth–Superior Dukes (1993–2002 team)
- Duluth Huskies
