= Joe Millay =

American baseball player (1914–2001)

Joseph Bernard Millay (25 June 1914 – 26 November 2001) was a Minor League Baseball pitcher for the Superior Blues in 1936 and the Winnipeg Maroons in 1937–1938. He left professional baseball in 1938 when his father, who managed a bakery in Evansville, Indiana, was severely injured by an oven explosion.

Millay (right) and Dickie Kerr

Millay graduated from Reitz Memorial High School in Evansville, Indiana in 1933. He graduated with his B.A. in Physical Education from Hamline University in St. Paul, Minnesota in 1937. he served in the U.S. Navy during World War II, and was stationed at the Naval Air Station, Trinidad, where, among other duties, he was a bowling instructor.

According to a 1945 Ripley's Believe It or Not article, Millay is the only athlete to achieve perfection in three sports in the same year. In 1938, he rolled a 300 in bowling, scored an ace in golf, and pitched a scoreless no-hitter for a professional baseball team. In his lifetime, he scored two aces in golf, pitched two no-hit games in professional baseball, and rolled 13 perfect games in bowling.
