= Verl Westergard =

American athlete and coach (1921–2001)

Biographical details
- Born: November 19, 1921; Belgrade, Minnesota, U.S.
- Died: October 4, 2001 (aged 79); Seguin, Texas, U.S.

Playing career

Football
- 1939–1942: Gustavus Adolphus

Baseball
- 1943: Superior Bays
- 1946: Superior Bays
- 1947: Waterloo White Hawks
- Position: Relief pitcher (baseball)

Coaching career (HC unless noted)

Football
- 1946–1949: Gustavus Adolphus (assistant)
- 1950–1952: Upsala (line)
- 1953–1961: Hutchinson HS (MN)
- 1962–1963: Texas Lutheran

Basketball
- 1949: Gustavus Adolphus
- 1959–1972: Texas Lutheran

Baseball
- 1948–1951: Gustavus Adolphus

Head coaching record
- Overall: 10–9 (college football); 109–217 (college basketball); 28–35 (college baseball)

Verl A. "Jiggs" Westergard (November 19, 1921 – October 4, 2001) was an American football, basketball, and baseball player and coach. He served the head men's basketball coach at his alma mater, Gustavus Adolphus College in St. Peter, Minnesota in 1949. He later served as a line coach at Upsala College in East Orange, New Jersey and as a football, basketball and golf coach at Texas Lutheran University in Seguin, Texas until his retirement.

== Head coaching record ==
=== Football ===
Year	Team	Overall	Conference	Standing	Bowl/playoffs
Texas Lutheran Bulldogs (NAIA independent) (1962–1963)
1962	Texas Lutheran	5–4			
1963	Texas Lutheran	5–5			
Texas Lutheran:		10–9			
Total:		10–9			
