= Don Nicholas =

American baseball player (1930–2007)

- Pinch runner / Pinch hitter
- Born: October 30, 1930; Phoenix, Arizona, US
- Died: October 23, 2007 (aged 76); Garden Grove, California, US
- Batted: Left Threw: Right

MLB debut
- April 16, 1952, for the Chicago White Sox

Last MLB appearance
- May 9, 1954, for the Chicago White Sox

MLB statistics
- Games played: 10
- Runs scored: 3
- Hits: 0
- Stats at Baseball Reference

Teams
- Chicago White Sox (1952, 1954)

Donald Leigh Nicholas (October 30, 1930 – October 23, 2007) was an American professional baseball player who played from 1948 to 1959. Initially a shortstop in minor league baseball, then an outfielder, Nicholas received two brief trials in the Major Leagues with the 1952 and 1954 Chicago White Sox as a pinch hitter and pinch runner. The native of Phoenix, Arizona, batted left-handed, threw right-handed, stood 5 feet 7 inches (1.70 m) tall and weighed 150 pounds (68 kg).

Nicholas originally signed with the Brooklyn Dodgers and was a successful base stealer during his minor league career, surpassing the 30-stolen-base mark at least three times during his career. Purchased by the White Sox after the 1951 minor league season, Nicholas made his MLB debut on April 16, 1952, when he pinch ran for Eddie Robinson in a 1–0 defeat at the hands of the Cleveland Indians. The following day, he pinch hit for pitcher Howie Judson and was retired by Mike Garcia. Four days later, he batted for Hal Brown and bounced out to St. Louis Browns pitcher Ned Garver. After spending the rest of 1952 and all of 1953 in the White Sox' farm system, Nicholas made Chicago's opening day roster in 1954. He pinch hit once (and received a base on balls) and scored three runs, but was sent to the Triple-A Havana Sugar Kings at the May cutdown date and played the rest of his career in the minors.
