= Wally Gilbert =

American baseball player (1900–1958)

- Gilbert with Brooklyn, c. 1930
- Third baseman
- Born: December 19, 1900; Oscoda, Michigan, U.S.
- Died: September 7, 1958 (aged 57); Duluth, Minnesota, U.S.
- Batted: Right Threw: Right

MLB debut
- August 17, 1928, for the Brooklyn Robins

Last MLB appearance
- September 24, 1932, for the Cincinnati Reds

MLB statistics
- Batting average: .269
- Home runs: 7
- Runs batted in: 214
- Stats at Baseball Reference

Teams
- Brooklyn Robins (1928–1931); Cincinnati Reds (1932)

Walter John Gilbert (December 19, 1900 – September 7, 1958) was an American athlete who performed in professional baseball, football and basketball.

Over his career, Gilbert played in Major League Baseball from 1928 to 1932 as a third baseman with the Brooklyn Robins and the Cincinnati Reds. In addition, he played in the National Football League from 1923 to 1926 for the Duluth Kelleys/Eskimos, as well as for the Buffalo Germans, Denver Tigers and Two Harbors All-Stars basketball squads.

== Early years ==
Gilbert was born in 1900 in Oscoda, Michigan. He moved to Duluth, Minnesota, as a child. At the time of the 1910 U.S. Census, he was living with his parents, Walter and Minnie Gilbert, in Duluth's 7th Ward. At the time of the 1920 U.S. Census, Gilbert's father, Walter Gilbert Sr., was employed as a laborer in a Duluth steel plant.

Gilbert graduated from Denfeld High School in Duluth where he starred in baseball, basketball and football. He led Denfeld's football team to a city championship before graduating in 1920.

After graduating from high school, Gilbert attended Valparaiso University in Valparaiso, Indiana. He played for Valparaiso's 1920 football team that compiled a record of 5-3 and outscored opponents 215 to 60. Gilbert also played baseball and basketball at Valparaiso.

== Football career ==
In the field position game that was the early NFL, Gilbert was a punting weapon for Duluth in the early 1920s.

From 1923 to 1926, Gilbert played professional football as a halfback and punter for the Duluth franchise in the National Football League. Gilbert played in the backfield with Ernie Nevers and handled punting and forward passing for the Duluth team. He reportedly punted the football 98 yards in a game against Rock Island and set an unofficial football record by drop-kicking a football 61 yards.

Gilbert also served on the football coaching staff at Superior State Teachers College (now known as University of Wisconsin–Superior) in 1938.

== Baseball career ==
=== Minor leagues ===
Gilbert began his professional baseball career in 1922 playing in the Dakota League for the Valley City Hi-Liners in Valley City, North Dakota. He compiled a .362 batting average for Valley City in 1922.

In 1923, he was acquired by the St. Joseph Saints in the Western League. In April 1923, the St. Joseph Gazette introduced Gilbert to its readers as follows:

"He is a well-built lad of some six feet and weighs round 180 pounds. Last reports received from the Saints' training camp at Clarksdale, Miss., are to the effect that Wally has located his batting eye and that he is now smacking the ball regularly and hard. He is a bachelor and good looking despite the way the photographer caught him, covered with four days' growth of stubby beard."

During the 1924 and 1925 baseball seasons, he remained with St. Joseph, appearing in 167 games in 1924 and 152 games in 1925.

In 1925, Gilbert's contract was purchased by the New York Yankees as a potential insurance for injury-prone third baseman, Joe Dugan. Gilbert did not make the Yankees' roster, and he was sold in the spring of 1926 to the Atlanta Crackers of the Southern Association. Gilbert played for the Crackers from 1926 to 1928 and proved to be a reliable hitter, batting .305 in 1926, .314 in 1927, and .319 in 1928.

=== Major League Baseball ===
In August 1928, Gilbert was traded by the Yankees to the Brooklyn Robins (later renamed the Dodgers) in exchange for Jay Partridge. Gilbert was the Robins/Dodgers' starting third baseman from the time he joined the club in August 1928 through the end of the 1931 season. While playing with Brooklyn, Gilbert became known as "The Old Reliable" and developed a reputation as a quiet, dependable fielder. His best years as a batter were 1929 and 1930 when he compiled batting averages of .304 and .294 with 353 hits, 65 doubles, and 125 RBIs. On May 30, 1931, Gilbert tied a Major League record with six hits in a single game against the New York Giants.

In March 1932, Gilbert was traded by the Dodgers to the Cincinnati Reds in a deal that sent Gilbert, Babe Herman, and Ernie Lombardi to the Reds in exchange for Joe Stripp, Tony Cuccinello and Clyde Sukeforth. Gilbert appeared in 114 games for the Reds in 1932, but his batting average dropped more than 50 points below his career average to .214.

At the end of the 1932 season, Gilbert was released by the Reds. The Sporting News reported: "Gilbert's departure via a straight release did not create much excitement here, as the fans hardly expected him to be retained. Wally tried hard at third base last year, but fell shy, so the bugs expected him to move on." Gilbert was acquired in 1933 by the St. Louis Cardinals, but he never made the Cardinals' roster and never played another game in the Major Leagues.

In September 1954, Roscoe McGowen in The Sporting News selected Gilbert over Billy Cox and Joe Stripp as the third baseman on his All-Time Dodgers team. McGowen wrote that, even though Gilbert only hit .300 in one of his years as a Dodger, "[h]e was an aggressive player, what the boys call today one of the 'old pros.'"

=== Return to the minor leagues ===
In 1933, Gilbert returned to the minor leagues and played for the Rochester Red Wings in the International League.

In December 1933, Gilbert signed a contract to play in 1934 for the Baltimore Orioles of the International League. In May 1934, Gilbert also took over as the Orioles' manager.

Gilbert continued to play in the minor leagues for several years with the Duluth Dukes and Knoxville Smokies in 1935 and the Duluth Dukes in 1936. In May 1938, Bruno Haas, owner of the Winnipeg Maroons of the Northern League hired Gilbert to play at third base and manage the team. and Superior Blues in 1938.

In December 1938, Gilbert was signed as the player-manager of the Northern League franchise at Wausau, Wisconsin.

Gilbert played in the short-lived Twin Ports League in 1943 for the Marine Iron team, and led the league with a .456 batting average.

== Basketball career ==
Gilbert also played several seasons of professional basketball. He played for a professional touring basketball team known as the Two Harbors All-Stars from Two Harbors, Minnesota. He also played for a basketball team sponsored by the Duluth Tank Corp., as well as professional teams in Buffalo, New York (Buffalo Germans) and Denver, Colorado (Denver Tigers).

== Family and later years ==
Gilbert was married to Mary McKay in 1937. They had two children, Pat and John. In 1942, he took a job with U.S. Steel in Duluth and lived at 5217 London Road in Duluth's Lakeside neighborhood. While working for U.S. Steel, he managed the Duluth Marine Iron baseball team in the Twin Ports League. He developed a serious lung infection in 1943 and had surgery to remove one of his lungs. Gilbert was unable to work after the loss of his lung. He died in September 1958 in Duluth.

Gilbert was posthumously inducted into the Duluth Sports Hall of Fame in 1969, and was selected by the Duluth News-Tribune as "the greatest athlete ever developed in Duluth."

== See also ==
- List of Major League Baseball single-game hits leaders
