= Waterloo Diamonds =

Professional minor-league baseball team in Waterloo, Iowa (1989–1993)

The Waterloo Diamonds was a baseball team located in Waterloo, Iowa that formed in 1989 and lasted until 1993. A member of the Midwest League, they were affiliated with two teams in 1989, the Baltimore Orioles and San Diego Padres, and the franchise was a descendant of the Waterloo Hawks. From 1990 to 1993, they were affiliated solely with the Padres. Their stadium was Riverfront Stadium.

== Year-by-year record ==
Year	Record	Finish	Manager	Playoffs
1989	47-89	14th	Jaime Moreno	
1990	60-76	11th	Bryan Little	
1991	75-63	4th	Bryan Little	
1992	59-78	12th	Keith Champion	
1993	54-79	13th	Ed Romero	
