= Barry Latman =

American baseball player (1936–2019)

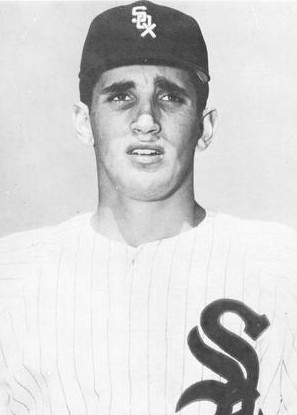
- Pitcher
- Born: May 21, 1936; Los Angeles, California, U.S.
- Died: April 28, 2019 (aged 82); Richmond, Texas, U.S.
- Batted: Right Threw: Right

MLB debut
- September 10, 1957, for the Chicago White Sox

Last MLB appearance
- August 12, 1967, for the Houston Astros

MLB statistics
- Win–loss record: 59–68
- Earned run average: 3.91
- Strikeouts: 829
- Stats at Baseball Reference

Teams
- Chicago White Sox (1957–1959); Cleveland Indians (1960–1963); Los Angeles / California Angels (1964–1965); Houston Astros (1966–1967)

Career highlights and awards
- All-Star (1961²)

Arnold Barry Latman (May 21, 1936 – April 28, 2019) was an American professional All Star Major League Baseball pitcher.

== Early and personal life ==
Latman was born in Los Angeles, California, and was Jewish. Latman would not pitch on the Jewish High Holidays. His parents were Nathan (a furniture auctioneer) and Elsie (Snitzer) Latman. He had two younger sisters, Ann Lorraine and Carolee. When he was 10 years old, his parents required that he stop playing baseball for three years, to leave himself time to study for his bar mitzvah. He was nicknamed “Shoulders.” He died on April 28, 2019, in Richmond, Texas.

== High school and college ==
He attended Fairfax High School, pitching for the baseball team, and playing alongside future major leaguer Larry Sherry. He threw a perfect game in 1954, and was named the Los Angeles All-City Player by the Helms Athletic Foundation. He then attended the University of Southern California on a baseball scholarship.

== Career ==
In the minor leagues in 1955 he pitched in Waterloo, Iowa, for the Waterloo White Hawks, in the Class-B Three-I League, and was 18–5 with an earned run average of 4.12, leading the league in innings pitched, and with his 18 wins one behind league leader Mudcat Grant. In 1956, he pitched for the Memphis Chicks in the Double-A Southern Association, and was 14–14 with a 3.85 earned run average. In 1957 he pitched for the Indianapolis Indians of the Triple-A American Association, going 13–13 with an earned-run average of 3.95, and in three starts for the team the following year he was 3–0 with a 0.76 ERA.

Latman played all or part of 11 seasons in the majors, from 1957 until 1967, for the Chicago White Sox, Cleveland Indians, Los Angeles/California Angels, and Houston Astros.

In 1959 he was 6th in the American League in strikeouts per 9 innings pitched (5.596). In 1961 he was 4th in the AL with a .722 winning percentage, as he went 13–5 for the Indians. Latman was an All Star in 1961.

In 1997 he was inducted into the Southern California Jewish Sports Hall of Fame.

Through 2010, Latman was 6th all-time in career strikeouts (directly behind Jason Marquis), and 8th in games (344; directly behind Sandy Koufax) and wins (59; directly behind Erskine Mayer) among Jewish major league baseball players.

== See also ==
- List of Jewish Major League Baseball players
