= Larry See =

American baseball player (born 1960)

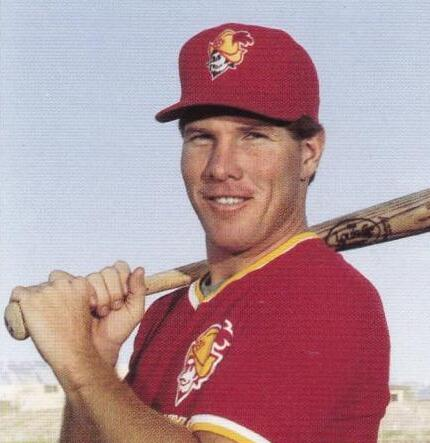
- See with the Albuquerque Dukes c. 1987
- First baseman
- Born: June 20, 1960 (age 65); Norwalk, California, U.S.
- Batted: Right Threw: Right

MLB debut
- September 3, 1986, for the Los Angeles Dodgers

Last MLB appearance
- August 16, 1988, for the Texas Rangers

MLB statistics
- Batting average: .186
- Home runs: 0
- Runs: 1

CPBL statistics
- Batting average: .180
- Home runs: 2
- Runs batted in: 12
- Stats at Baseball Reference

Teams
- Los Angeles Dodgers (1986); Texas Rangers (1988); China Times Eagles (1993)

Ralph Laurence See (born June 20, 1960) is a former first baseman. He played in 26 games for the Los Angeles Dodgers and Texas Rangers during the 1986 and 1988 baseball seasons.

== Amateur career ==
See attended Norwalk High School in California where, in 1977, he won a California Interscholastic Federation championship as a football player. He played college football and college baseball at Cerritos College. As a linebacker, he was twice named to the All-South Coast Conference Team. In 1979, he set a school record for tackles in a single season. On the baseball field, he was named to the All-SCC Team as a freshman. He managed a .337 batting average over two seasons.

== Professional career ==
After leaving the Rangers organization in 1988, he played in the Mexican League through 1994 before attempting a comeback with the San Diego Padres. He played in the minors for the Padres in 1995, with the Rancho Cucamonga Quakes and Las Vegas Stars.

He then managed the Arizona League Padres in 1996 and played in the Northern League for the Thunder Bay Whiskey Jacks and Duluth–Superior Dukes from 1997–1999.

In 2013, he joined the coaching staff of the Phoenix Prospectors in the Freedom Pro Baseball League.
