= Bill Taunton Stadium =

Baseball stadium in Willmar, Minnesota

- Location within Minnesota
- Address: 1401 SW. 22nd St., Willmar, MN 56201
- Location: Willmar, Minnesota
- Coordinates: 45°06′29″N 95°04′19″W
- Capacity: 2,000
- Surface: grass
- Field size: Left field 324 ft. Center field 373 ft. Right field 326 ft.

Construction
- Opened: 1979
- Renovated: 2005-2006 ($1M+)
- Architect: “Stadium Steve” Snyder (renovations)

Tenant
- Willmar Stingers (NWL) 2010–present

Baker Field at Bill Taunton Stadium is a baseball stadium in Willmar, Minnesota that is home to the Willmar Stingers of the Northwoods League, a collegiate summer baseball league. Bill Taunton Stadium is also home to Willmar High School baseball, Ridgewater College baseball, two local VFW teams, and an American Legion team. The stadium annually hosts a kickball game between the Willmar Stingers and teachers at nearby Roosevelt Elementary on the last day of school. In 2010, the stadium hosted the Minnesota State Amateur Baseball Tournament.

The current grandstand was put up in 2005 as part of $1 million in renovations after a tornado wiped out the old grandstand. Enhancements were made to the ballpark for the 2017 season: a home plate club area featuring tables with swivel seats; a ballpark beach experience with festive games such as bean bags and Jenga; a newly created dugout suite for smaller groups; and permanent sun shades and new aluminum barstools with seatbacks in all hospitality suites.

Baker Field at Bill Taunton Stadium is named for two prominent local figures. Bill Taunton was a grocerer, Air Force veteran, community leader, and Big Ten Umpire instrumental in bringing the American Legion State Tournament to Willmar three times, including 1979, the first full season for this ball field. Orville Baker was Willmar Parks Superintendent from 1956 until his death in 1977. When the previous ballpark, Hodapp Field, was torn down for a new football stadium, the park board dedicated the new baseball field to his memory.
