= Jerry Bunyard =

American Army general

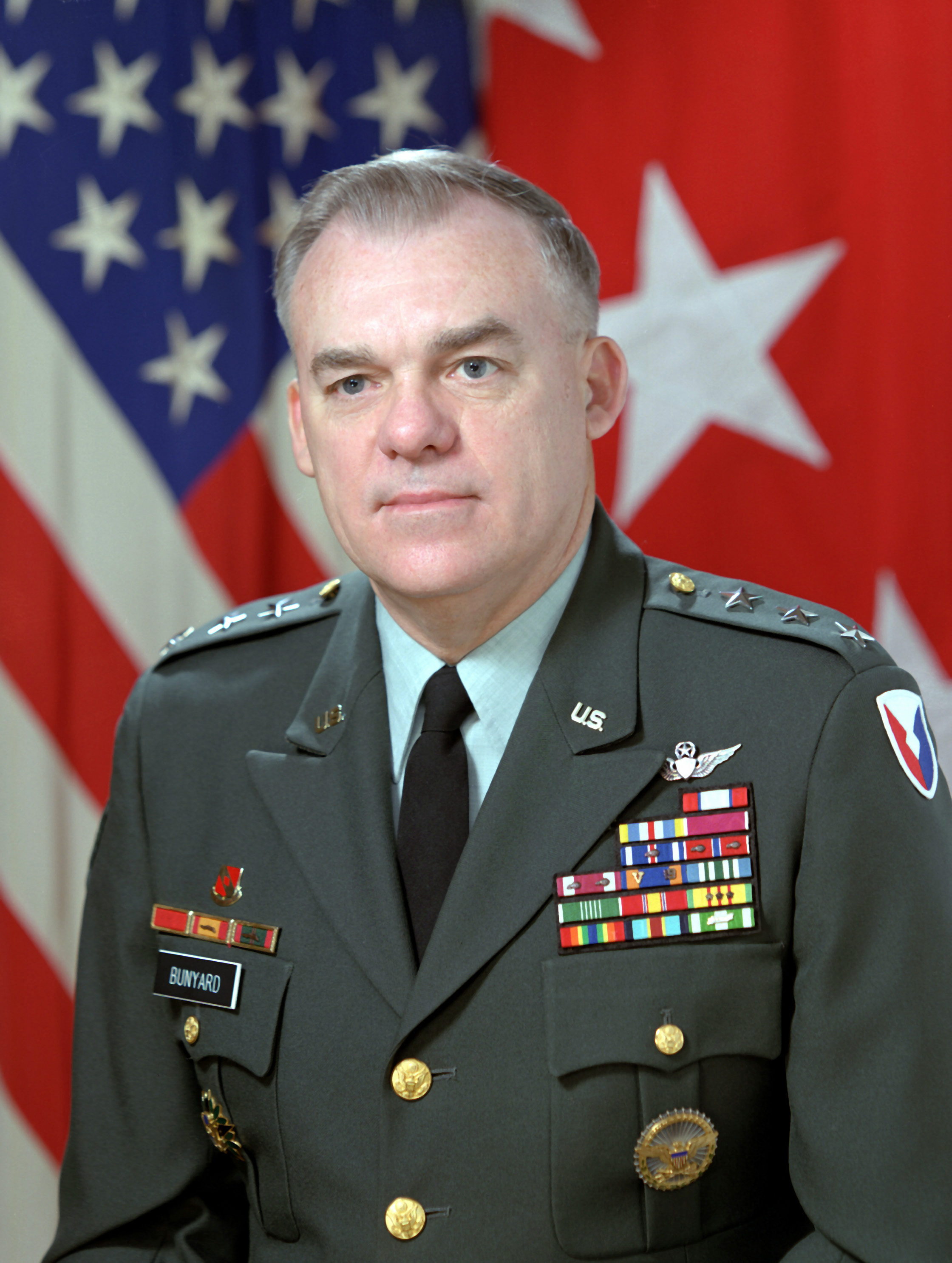
- Born: Jerry Max Bunyard; April 3, 1931 (age 95); Altus, Oklahoma, U.S.
- Military career
- Allegiance: United States
- Branch: United States Army
- Service years: 1954–1989
- Rank: Lieutenant General
- Commands: United States Army Missile Command; Yuma Proving Ground; 2nd Battalion, 20th Aerial Field Artillery Regiment
- Conflicts: Vietnam War
- Awards: Distinguished Service Medal (2); Defense Superior Service Medal; Legion of Merit; Distinguished Flying Cross (2); Bronze Star Medal (3); Meritorious Service Medal (3); Air Medal (19)

Jerry Max Bunyard (born April 3, 1931) is a retired lieutenant general in the United States Army. His assignments included Commanding General of the United States Army Missile Command and deputy commanding general for research, development and acquisition at the United States Army Materiel Command.

Born and raised in Altus, Oklahoma, Bunyard was an All State baseball player for Altus High School, helping to win a state championship before graduating in 1949. He attended Oklahoma Baptist University for one year before transferring to Oklahoma A&M College, where he continued to play baseball and also participated in the Army ROTC program. Bunyard graduated from Oklahoma A&M in 1954 with a B.S. degree in animal husbandry and was commissioned as a second lieutenant of Infantry. Signed by the Chicago White Sox, he played one summer of minor league baseball with the Waterloo White Hawks and Colorado Springs Sky Sox before reporting for active duty in the Army.

Bunyard transferred from the Infantry to the Artillery and was trained as a Cobra helicopter gunship pilot. He graduated from the Army Command and General Staff College in 1965 and later earned an M.S. degree in international relations from George Washington University.

During the Vietnam War, Bunyard served as division artillery aviation officer with the 1st Infantry Division and as commanding officer of the 2nd Battalion, 20th Artillery, 1st Cavalry Division (Airmobile). Back in the United States, he was given command of the Yuma Proving Ground in Arizona.

Bunyard was promoted to lieutenant general in 1987 and retired from active duty in 1989.
