= Dominican Summer League White Sox =

- Boca Chica

Minor league affiliations
- Class: Rookie
- League: Dominican Summer League
- Division: Boca Chica Baseball City

Major league affiliations
- Team: Chicago White Sox

Minor league titles
- League titles (0): None

Team data
- Name: White Sox
- Ballpark: Baseball City Complex
- Owner(s)/ Operator(s): Chicago White Sox
- Manager: Wellington Morrobel & Anthony Nunez

The Dominican Summer League White Sox or DSL White Sox are a rookie league affiliate of the Chicago White Sox based in the Dominican Republic. They play in the Boca Chica Baseball City division of the Dominican Summer League.

== History ==
The team first came into existence in 1989 as a joint affiliate of the Houston Astros and the Texas Rangers. From 1990 to 1993, and again in 1995, the team shared an affiliation with the Baltimore Orioles. The team suspended operations for the 1994 season. In 1996, the team shared an affiliation with the Milwaukee Brewers, before suspending operations again for 1997. The team returned in 1998 with a shared affiliation with the Anaheim Angels. The team became an independent White Sox affiliate in 1999, which they have remained ever since. For the 2007 and 2008 seasons, the team split into DSL White Sox 1 and DSL White Sox 2.

== Roster ==
Dominican Summer League White Sox roster
| Players | | Coaches/Other |
| Pitchers: 55 Darlyn Almanzar ‡; -- Cesar Bolivar; -- Felix Doroteo; -- Cesar Familia; -- Juan Felix; -- Reinder Gomez; -- Jhonny Morao; -- Cesar Nunez; -- Diego Perez; -- Alexander Pichardo ‡; -- Emmanuel Ramirez; -- Yobal Rodriguez; 28 Orlando Suarez; -- Natanael Valerio | Catchers: -- Diego Natera; -- Juan Oviedo; Infielders: 24 Rafael Alvarez; -- Alejandro Cruz; -- Igor Escobar; 1 Eduardo Herrera; 22 Jehancarlos Mendez; -- Jefrank Silva; Outfielders: -- Hendry Alcala; -- Jeremias Aponte; -- Alan Escobar; 53 Christian Gonzalez; -- Frank Mieses | Manager: -- Wellington Morrobel; -- Anthony Nunez; Coaches: Fran Bautista (performance); -- Jose Brito (pitching); Carlos Javier (performance); -- Moises Nunez (hitting); -- Stolmy Pimentel (assistant pitching); -- Guillermo Reyes (infield); Rigoberto Silverio (development); 7-day injured list * On Chicago White Sox 40-man roster ~ Development list # Rehab assignment ∞ Reserve list ‡ Restricted list § Suspended list † Temporarily inactive list Roster updated May 22, 2025; Transactions → More rosters: MiLB • Dominican Summer League → Chicago White Sox minor league players |
