= Jonah Bride =

American baseball player (born 1995)

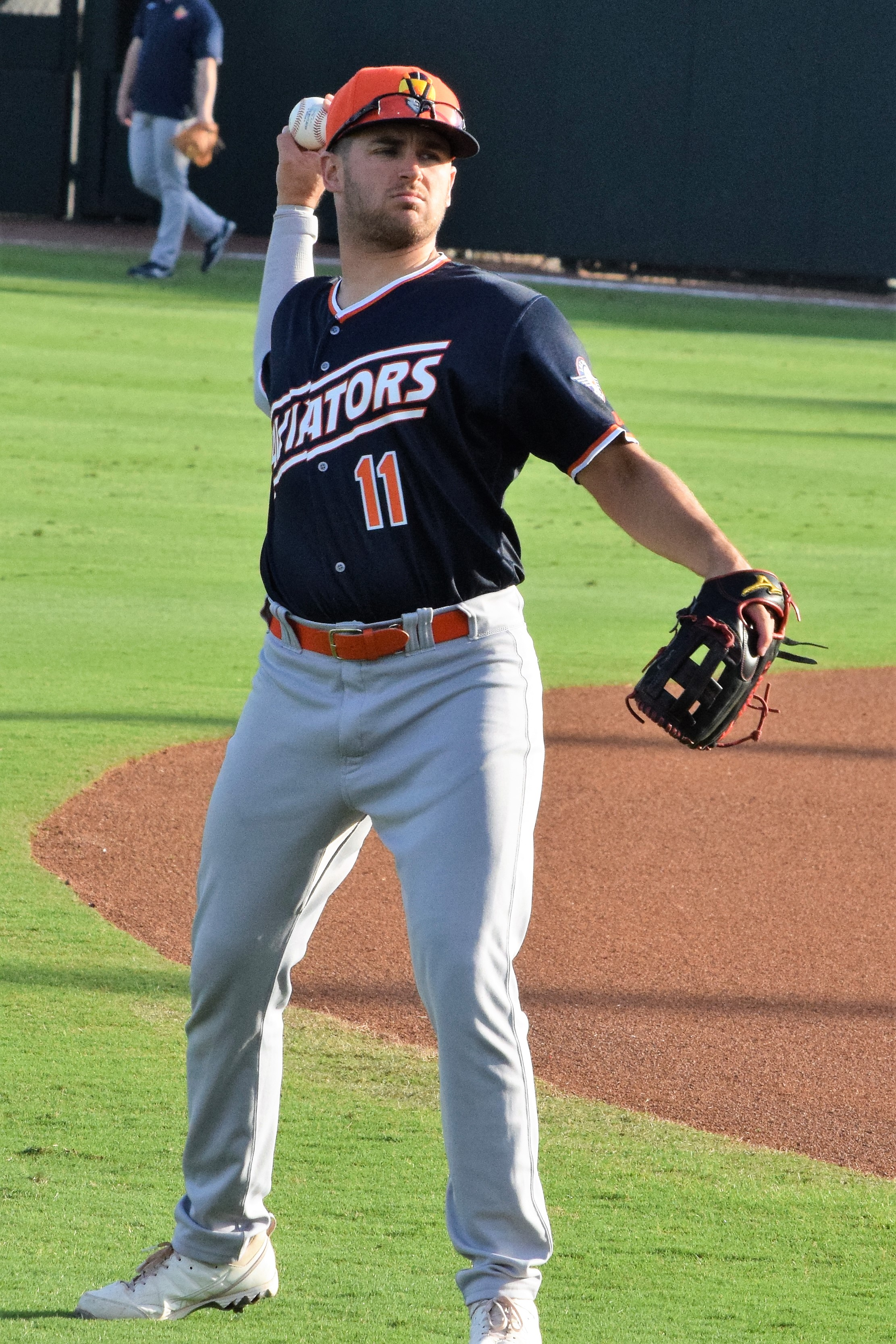
- Bride with the Las Vegas Aviators in 2023

Free agent
- Infielder
- Born: December 27, 1995 (age 30); Milwaukee, Wisconsin, U.S.
- Bats: Right Throws: Right

MLB debut
- June 14, 2022, for the Oakland Athletics

MLB statistics (through 2026 season)
- Batting average: .220
- Home runs: 12
- Runs batted in: 57
- Stats at Baseball Reference

Teams
- Oakland Athletics (2022–2023); Miami Marlins (2024–2025); Minnesota Twins (2025); Texas Rangers (2026)

Jonah Michael Bride (born December 27, 1995) is an American professional baseball infielder who is a free agent. He has previously played in Major League Baseball (MLB) for the Oakland Athletics, Miami Marlins, Minnesota Twins and Texas Rangers.

== Amateur career ==
Bride graduated from Owasso High School in Owasso, Oklahoma. He played college baseball at Neosho County Community College and the University of South Carolina.

In 2015, Bride played collegiate summer baseball for the Wisconsin Rapids Rafters and the Waterloo Bucks of the Northwoods League.

Bride was drafted by the Oakland Athletics in the 23rd round of the 2018 Major League Baseball draft.

== Professional career ==
=== Oakland Athletics ===
Bride signed with Oakland and made his professional debut with the rookie-level Arizona League Athletics before being promoted to the Vermont Lake Monsters. Over 56 games between the two clubs, he batted .280 with three home runs and 34 RBI. He spent the 2019 season with the Stockton Ports and Midland RockHounds, hitting .277 with ten home runs and 58 RBI over 117 games. He did not play in a game in 2020 due to the cancellation of the minor league season because of the COVID-19 pandemic. In 2021, Bride played returned to Midland, slashing .265/.407/.424 with nine home runs and 49 RBI over 78 games.

The Athletics added Bride to their 40-man roster after the 2021 season, in order to protect him from the Rule 5 draft. He opened the 2022 season with the Triple-A Las Vegas Aviators. The Athletics promoted him to the major leagues on June 14 and he made his MLB debut that night. On June 15, Bride collected his first major league hit on a single off of Boston Red Sox starter Josh Winckowski. He hit his first major league home run against Gerrit Cole of the New York Yankees on August 26. In 2022 for the A's, he batted .204/.301/.247 with one home runs and six RBI in 162 at-bats, playing primarily second base.

Bride was optioned to Triple-A Las Vegas to begin the 2023 season. He was recalled to the majors on May 29. In 40 appearances for Oakland, he batted .170/.286/.205 with no home runs and seven RBI in 88 at-bats, playing primarily third base. On February 2, 2024, Bride was designated for assignment following the acquisition of Ross Stripling.

=== Miami Marlins ===
On February 6, 2024, Bride was traded to the Miami Marlins in exchange for cash considerations. Bride was sent down to the Triple-A Jacksonville Jumbo Shrimp on April 4. He was called up on May 4, to replace Luis Arráez after he was traded. In 71 appearances for Miami, Bride slashed .276/.357/.461 with career-highs in home runs (11) and RBI (39).

Bride made Miami's Opening Day roster in 2025, going 4-for-40 (.100) with two RBI over 12 games. Bride was designated for assignment by the Marlins on April 15, 2025.

=== Minnesota Twins ===
On April 16, 2025, Bride was traded to the Minnesota Twins in exchange for cash considerations. On June 5, Bride was brought in to pitch during a blowout loss against the Athletics; he subsequently struck out Jacob Wilson for his first career pitching strikeout. In 32 appearances for Minnesota, he batted .214/.282/.243 with three RBI and six walks. Bride was designated for assignment by the Twins on June 29. He cleared waivers and was sent outright to the Triple-A St. Paul Saints on July 2. Bride elected free agency following the season on November 6.

=== Texas Rangers ===
On November 25, 2025, Bride signed a minor league contract with the Texas Rangers. He was released by Texas on July 13, 2026. On July 17, Bride re-signed with the Rangers organization on a new minor league contract. He made 97 total appearances for the Triple–A Round Rock Express, batting .282/.401/.425 with 10 home runs, 60 RBI, and nine stolen bases. On August 9, the Rangers selected Bride's contract, adding him to their active roster. In two games for the team, he went 1–for–5 (.200) with a walk. Bride was designated for assignment by Texas on August 11. He cleared waivers and was sent outright to Triple–A Round Rock on August 13. He elected free agency on October 3.
