= Twin Ports League =

Defunct baseball league

- Most recent season or competition: 1943 Twin Ports League season
- Classification: Class E (1943)
- Sport: Minor League Baseball
- Founder: Frank Wade
- First season: 1943
- Folded: July 14, 1943
- President: Frank Wade (1943)
- No. of teams: 4
- Country: United States of America
- Most titles: 1 Superior Bays (1943)

The Twin Ports League was an American minor baseball league that existed for six weeks (May 30 through July 13) during the wartime 1943 season. It consisted of four teams based in Duluth, Minnesota and Superior, Wisconsin.

== History ==
The Twin Ports League was the only league to be designated Class E—one level below the previously lowest minor league level, Class D—by the National Association of Professional Baseball Leagues (the formal name of Minor League Baseball).

According to Baseball America's Encyclopedia of Minor League Baseball, many of the players in the Twin Ports League were employed in the Twin Ports' war factories, dockyards and shipyards. The teams included the Duluth Dukes, Duluth Heralds, Duluth Marine Iron, and the Superior Bays. The Superior club was in first place when the league disbanded on July 13, 1943.

Only one player in the Twin Ports League eventually reached Major League Baseball—Superior's Ernie Rudolph, who pitched in seven games for the 1945 Brooklyn Dodgers.

Former major league player Wally Gilbert managed the Marine Iron team.

== Cities represented ==
- Duluth, MN: Duluth Dukes 1943; Duluth Heralds 1943; Duluth Marine Iron 1943
- Superior, WI: Superior Bays 1943

== Standings and statistics ==
1943 Twin Ports League

Team standings	W	L	PCT	GB	Managers
Superior Bays	11	7	.611	-	Red Treadwell / John Schroeder
Duluth Marine Iron	9	7	.563	1	Wally Gilbert
Duluth Dukes	9	10	.474	2½	Bud McPherson
Duluth Heralds	5	10	.333	4½	Frank Summers

The league disbanded July 13.

Player statistics
Player	Team	Stat	Tot	Player	Team	Stat	Tot
Wally Gilbert	Marine Iron	BA	.456	Ed Anderson	Marine Iron	W	4
John Schroeder	Superior	Runs	21	Bob Connolly	Superior	W	4
John Schroeder	Superior	Hits	27	Verl Westergard	Superior	SO	56
John Schroeder	Superior	RBI	23	Verl Westergard	Superior	ERA	2.25
John Norlander	Dukes	HR	1	R.A. Ryan	Dukes	PCT	1.000 3-0
Joe Shonts	Heralds	HR	1				
