= Ernie Rudolph =

American baseball player (1909-2003)

- Pitcher
- Born: February 13, 1909; Black River Falls, Wisconsin, U.S.
- Died: January 13, 2003 (aged 93); Black River Falls, Wisconsin, U.S.
- Batted: Left Threw: Right

MLB debut
- June 16, 1945, for the Brooklyn Dodgers

Last MLB appearance
- July 6, 1945, for the Brooklyn Dodgers

MLB statistics
- Win–loss record: 1–0
- Earned run average: 5.19
- Strikeouts: 3
- Stats at Baseball Reference

Teams
- Brooklyn Dodgers (1945)

Ernest William Rudolph (February 13, 1909 – January 13, 2003) was an American Major League Baseball pitcher who appeared in seven games, all in relief, for the Brooklyn Dodgers in 1945. The 36-year-old rookie right-hander stood 5 ft 8 in (1.73 m) and weighed 165 lb (75 kg).

Rudolph is one of many ballplayers who only appeared in the major leagues during World War II. He made his major league debut on June 16, 1945 against the Boston Braves at Braves Field. His lone major league win came eleven days later in a 6–5 victory over the Chicago Cubs at Ebbets Field.

Season and career totals for 7 games include a 1–0 record, 2 games finished, and an ERA of 5.19 in 8 2/3 innings pitched.

Rudolph is the only player from the short-lived Twin Ports League to ever play in the majors.

Rudolph died in his hometown of Black River Falls, Wisconsin at the age of 93.
