= Brandon Hughes =

Brandon Hughes may refer to:

- Brandon Hughes (American football) (born 1986), American former NFL cornerback
- Brandon Hughes (baseball) (born 1995), American MLB pitcher
