= Tom Flanigan (baseball) =

American baseball player (1934–2022)

- Pitcher
- Born: September 6, 1934; Cincinnati, Ohio, U.S.
- Died: December 8, 2022 (aged 88); Edgewood, Kentucky, U.S.
- Batted: Right Threw: Left

MLB debut
- April 14, 1954, for the Chicago White Sox

Last MLB appearance
- April 15, 1958, for the St. Louis Cardinals

MLB statistics
- Win–loss record: 0–0
- Earned run average: 3.38
- Strikeouts: 0
- Stats at Baseball Reference

Teams
- Chicago White Sox (1954); St. Louis Cardinals (1958)

Thomas Anthony Flanigan (September 6, 1934 – December 8, 2022) was an American professional baseball player: a 6 ft 3 in (1.91 m), 175 lb (79 kg) left-handed pitcher who appeared in three Major League Baseball games over the course of a seven-year professional career — two games for the 1954 Chicago White Sox and one for the 1958 St. Louis Cardinals.

Flanigan began his third professional season at age 19 on the White Sox' MLB roster, and appeared in two games, both in relief, allowing no runs and only one hit (a single to Frank Bolling of the Detroit Tigers) in 1 2/3 innings pitched. After spending the rest of 1954, and all of 1955 through 1957, in minor league baseball, he was selected in the winter 1957 Rule 5 draft by the Cardinals and began 1958 on their roster. In his only National League appearance, against the Chicago Cubs at Busch Stadium April 15, Flanigan hurled one inning in relief and allowed two hits and one run, the latter coming on a home run by Cub catcher Cal Neeman. He then was returned to the White Sox' Indianapolis Indians affiliate, from which he had been drafted.

Flanigan allowed three hits and one run in 2 2/3 MLB innings pitched, with two bases on balls and no strikeouts. In 246 minor league games from 1952 to 1958, he won 55 of 100 decisions.

Flanigan died in Edgewood, Kentucky, on December 8, 2022, at the age of 88.
