= Duluth–Superior Dukes (1956–1970) =

- 1956–1970; Duluth, Minnesota

Minor league affiliations
- Previous classes: Class A- (1966–1970); Class A (1963–1965); Class C (1956–1962)
- Previous leagues: Northern League (1956–1970)

Major league affiliations
- Previous teams: Chicago White Sox (1967–1970); Chicago Cubs (1965–1967); Detroit Tigers (1960–1965); Chicago White Sox (1956–1959)

Minor league titles
- League titles: 2 1969, 1970
- Conference titles: 1956, 1961, 1963

Team data
- Previous names: Duluth–Superior Dukes (1960–1970); Duluth–Superior White Sox (1956–1959)
- Previous parks: Wade Stadium (1956–1970)

The Duluth–Superior Dukes was the final moniker of the minor league baseball team, that represented Duluth, Minnesota and Superior, Wisconsin, playing from 1956 to 1970 exclusively as members of the Northern League.

Duluth–Superior teams were affiliates of the Chicago White Sox (1956–1959), Detroit Tigers (1960–1965), Chicago Cubs (1965–1967) and Chicago White Sox (1967–1970).

== History ==
The franchise formed in 1956 as the Duluth–Superior White Sox after a merger of the Duluth Dukes and the Superior Blues. The team name was changed back to the Dukes in 1960.

From 1960 to 1964, they were affiliated with the Detroit Tigers. In 1965, they were affiliated with the Tigers and Chicago Cubs. In 1966, they were affiliated with the Cubs. In 1967, they were affiliated with the Cubs and Chicago White Sox. From 1968 to 1970, they were affiliated with the White Sox alone. They wore pinstripe uniforms at home and powder blue jerseys with the SOX emblem on the chest on the road.

== The ballpark ==
The Dukes played their home games at Wade Stadium, located at 101 N. 35th Avenue West Duluth, Minnesota 55807. The stadium, built in 1940 is still in use today as home to the Duluth Huskies.

== Year-by-year record ==
Year	Record	Finish	Manager	Playoffs
1960	70–51	2nd	Frank Carswell	Lost League Finals
1961	76–52	1st	Bob Swift	Lost in 1st round
1962	69–55	2nd	Al Lakeman	Lost in 1st round
1963	77–43	1st	Bob Mavis	2nd in Baukol Playoffs
1964	61–55	3rd	Gail Henley	2nd in Baukol Playoffs
1965	31–35	2nd	Doc Daugherty	none
1966	29–36	4th	Joe Grace	none
1967	30–39	5th	Ira Hutchinson	none
1968	31–39	4th	Bruce Andrew	none
1969	46–23	1st	Pel Austin	League Champs
1970	48-21	1st	Joe Sparks	League Champs

== Notable alumni ==
- Gates Brown (1960)
- Pat Dobson (1962) MLB All-Star
- Bill Freehan (1961) 11× MLB All-Star
- John Hiller (1964) MLB All-Star
- Glen Hobbie (1956)
- Joe Hoerner (1957–1959) MLB All-Star
- Willie Horton (1962) 4× MLB All-Star
- Ira Hutchinson (1967, MGR)
- Pat Jarvis (1962–1963)
- Lamar Johnson (1970)
- Bruce Kimm (1970)
- Denny McLain (1963) 3× MLB All-Star; 2× AL Cy Young Award (1968–1969); 1968 AL Most Valuable Player
- J.C. Martin (1958)
- Don Mincher (1956–1957) 2× MLB All-Star
- Jim Northrup (1961–1962)
- Jim Rooker (1964)
- Joe Sparma (1963)
- Mickey Stanley (1961–1962) 5× Gold Glove

=== Other Major League player alumni ===
(from baseball-reference.com)

- 1960 – Aubrey Gatewood, Ray Oyler, Willie Smith
- 1961 – Leo Marentette, Tom Timmermann
- 1962 – Ike Brown, Vern Holtgrave
- 1963 – Pete Craig
- 1964 – Arlo Brunsberg, Wayne Comer, Jack DiLauro, Andy Kosco
- 1965 – Bill Butler
- 1968 – Don Eddy, Dan Neumeier, Scott Northey, Denny O'Toole
- 1969 – Stan Perzanowski, Glenn Redmon, Hugh Yancy
- 1970 – Bruce Miller, Hugh Yancy
