= Riverfront Stadium (Waterloo) =

Sports venue in Waterloo, Iowa, United States

- Riverfront Stadium logo
- Interactive map of Riverfront Stadium
- Location: 850 Park Rd, Waterloo, Iowa
- Coordinates: 42.510969°N 92.35355°W
- Capacity: 5,000
- Public transit: 3 MET Transit

Construction
- Built: 1946
- Opened: 1946

Tenants
- Waterloo Hawks (MWL) 1946–1956; 1958–1969; Waterloo Diamonds (MWL) 1989–1993; Waterloo Bucks (NWL) 1995–present

Riverfront Stadium is a stadium in Waterloo, Iowa, located at 850 Park Road, Waterloo, Iowa 50703. It is primarily used for baseball, serving as the home field of the Waterloo Bucks baseball team of the summer collegiate Northwoods League. Riverfront Stadium has a capacity of 5,000.

== History ==
Riverfront Stadium was built as Municipal Stadium in 1946. The stadium served as minor league baseball home to Waterloo Hawks teams in the Illinois–Indiana–Iowa League (1946–1956) and the Midwest League (1958–1993). The stadium was the site of the 1978 Midwest League All-Star Game on June 6, 1978.

The current Waterloo Bucks first began play at the stadium in 1995. The Midwest League team, last known as the Waterloo Diamonds, left Waterloo to become the Springfield Sultans before the 1994 season after the city of Waterloo failed to improve the stadium to meet Major League Baseball's newly imposed standards for minor league ballparks. The Diamonds evolved into today's Lansing Lugnuts of the Midwest League.

The University of Northern Iowa played home baseball games at Riverfront Stadium until U.N.I. dropped baseball following the 2009 season. The last game played by UNI at the stadium was on May 16, 2009, a 3–2 win against Bradley University.
