= Superior Blues =

- 1933–1955; (1933–1943, 1946–1955); Superior, Wisconsin

Minor league affiliations
- Previous classes: Class C (1946–1955); Class E (1943); Class C (1941–1942); Class D (1933–1940)
- League: Northern League (1946–1955)
- Previous leagues: Twin Ports League (1943); Northern League (1933–1942)

Major league affiliations
- Previous teams: Chicago White Sox (1942, 1946–1952, 1955); Brooklyn Dodgers (1938–1940); St. Louis Browns (1937)

Minor league titles
- League titles: 2 (1933, 1952)

Team data
- Previous names: Superior Bays (1943)

The Superior Blues were a minor league baseball team based in Superior, Wisconsin, USA. From 1933 to 1942 and from 1946 to 1955, the Blues played in the Northern League. In 1943, Superior fielded a team, called the Bays, in the Class-E Twin Ports League.

== History ==
In 1937, the Blues were affiliated with the St. Louis Browns. From 1938 to 1940, they were affiliated with the Brooklyn Dodgers. In 1942, from 1946 to 1952 and in 1955, they were affiliated with the Chicago White Sox.

Over the course of their history, they won two league championships. They first came in 1933 under manager Dick Wade and the second came in 1952 under Wally Millies.

In 1956, this team merged with the Duluth Dukes to form the Duluth–Superior Dukes.

While playing in Superior the team played its games at Superior Municipal Stadium adjacent to the UWS Campus. After being vacated by the Blues the stadium was destroyed by fire in 1963. A portion of UWS's Ostrander Hall now occupies the former stadium site.

== Major League Baseball players ==
=== Baseball Hall of Fame alumni ===
- Dizzy Dean, inducted to the National Baseball Hall of Fame in 1953, pitched and played outfield for the Blues for one game on July 19, 1942, a 6–3 loss to Winnipeg at Superior.

=== Other MLB alumni ===
- 1933 -- Morrie Arnovich, Rip Wade
- 1934—Morrie Arnovich, Rip Wade
- 1935 -- Blix Donnelly, Rip Wade
- 1938 -- Wally Gilbert, Pete Reiser
- 1939 -- Johnny Ostrowski
- 1940 -- Chappie Geygan, Bill Ramsey
- 1941 -- Len Perme
- 1942 -- Russ Kerns, Russ Meyer, Len Okrie
- 1943 -- Ernie Rudolph
- 1946 -- Art Johnson, Dick Strahs
- 1950 -- Ben Huffman, Red Kress, Ken Landenberger
- 1955 -- Fritz Ackley, Glen Hobbie, Hal Trosky
