= Duluth Huskies =

- Logo

Information
- League: Northwoods League (Great Plains East (2019–pres); North Division (2003–2018)
- Location: Duluth, Minnesota
- Ballpark: Wade Stadium
- Founded: 2003
- Division championships: 5 (2004, 2013, 2018, 2022, 2025)
- Colors: Navy, forest green, silver, white
- Mascot: Harley D. Huskie
- Ownership: Michael Rosenzweig
- Manager: Marcus Pointer
- Media: Duluth News Tribune
- Website: duluthhuskies.com

The Duluth Huskies are an amateur baseball team playing in the Northwoods League, a collegiate summer baseball league. They have been operating in Duluth, Minnesota since 2003. The Huskies play home games at Wade Stadium in Duluth, which was built in 1941.

== History ==
After the 2002 Northern League season, the Duluth-Superior Dukes were relocated, becoming the Kansas City T-Bones, leaving a vacancy at Wade Stadium. In time for the 2003 season, the Huskies were added as a Northwoods League expansion team, along with the La Crosse Loggers and Thunder Bay Border Cats.

The Huskies have advanced to the Northwoods League championship game five times (2004, 2013, 2018, 2022, 2025) and lost each time. In 2025, in front of a packed Wade Stadium, the Huskies held a commanding lead over the Green Bay Rockers throughout much of the game before surrendering it to a Green Bay rally and costly error.

Ethan Surowiec had a standout season for the Huskies in 2025, leading the league in many hitting categories (including home runs, RBI, and OPS) and earning league MVP honors. Surowiec also garnered national attention for incident in which he fielded a ground ball as a baserunner on his way from second to third base. Surowiec played for the Huskies after his freshman season at the University of Mississippi and transferred to the University of Florida to play for the Gators in his sophomore year.

== Seasonal record ==
Year	Division	Overall record	Finish	Playoffs	Manager
2003	North	24-39		None	Jeff Casper
2004	North	33-35		North Division Champion, Lost League Championship v. Madison Mallards	Jeff Casper
2005	North	36-32		None	Dave Para
2006	North	44-27		2nd Half North Division Champion	Dave Para
2007	North	41-29		2nd Half North Division Champion	Adam Stahl
2008	North	26-42		None	Adam Stahl
2009	North	25-43	7th	None	Adam Stahl/ Terry Collins
2010	North	34-32	4th	None	Daniel Hersey
2011	North	30-37	6th	None	Daniel Hersey
2012	North	38-32	3rd	None	Daniel Hersey
2013	North	43-27	2nd	North Division Champion, Lost League Championship v. Madison Mallards	Daniel Hersey
2014	North	30-42	7th	None	Daniel Hersey
2015	North	40-32	3rd	Wild Card	Daniel Hersey
2016	North	30-42	6th	None	Daniel Hersey
2017	North	31-41	9th	None	Daniel Hersey
2018	North	47-25	2nd	North Division Champion, Lost League Championship v. Fond du Lac Dock Spiders	Tyger D. Pederson
2019	Great Plains East	29-38	9th	None	Marcus Pointer
2020	Did not play due to COVID-19 pandemic				
2021	Great Plains East	30-38	2nd in Sub-division	Lost Sub-division Championship v. Waterloo Bucks	Marcus Pointer
2022	Great Plains East	34-33	2nd in Sub-division	Great Plains Division Champions, Lost League Championship v. Kalamazoo Growlers	Marcus Pointer
2023	Great Plains East	36-32	3rd in Sub-division	None	Marcus Pointer
2024	Great Plains East	38-31	2nd in Sub-division	Lost Sub-division championship v. La Crosse Loggers	Marcus Pointer
2025	Great Plains East	45-27	1st in Sub-division	Great Plains Division Champions, Lost League Championship v. Green Bay Rockers	Marcus Pointer
2026	Great Plains East	29-41	5th in Sub-division	None	Marcus Pointer

== Huskies in Major League baseball ==
The following is a list of Huskies players to appear in Major League Baseball.

Name	Season(s) in Duluth	MLB accolades
Cody Asche	2009/2010	
Aaron Barrett	2008	
Hunter Bigge	2018	
Joe Bisenius	2003	
Andy Burns	2008/2009	
Kristian Campbell	2022	AL Rookie of the Month (Apr. 2025)
Isaac Collins	2017	NL Rookie of the Month (Jul. 2025)
Steve Edlefsen	2004	
Rhyne Hughes	2004	
Connor Joe	2012	
Ryan Lollis	2006	
Doug Mathis	2004	
Wade Meckler	2019	
Mark Melancon	2004	4x All-Star, NL Reliever of the Year
Sean Poppen	2014	
Fernando Rodriguez	2003	
Drew Smyly	2009	World Series Champion (2021)
Nick Sogard	2018	
Logan VanWey	2018/2019	
Terrin Vavra	2015	
Zach Walters	2009	
