= Dick Strahs =

American baseball player (1923–1988)

- Pitcher
- Born: December 4, 1923; Evanston, Illinois, U.S.
- Died: May 26, 1988 (aged 64); Las Vegas, Nevada, U.S.
- Batted: Left Threw: Right

MLB debut
- July 24, 1954, for the Chicago White Sox

Last MLB appearance
- September 6, 1954, for the Chicago White Sox

MLB statistics
- Win–loss record: 0–0
- Earned run average: 5.65
- Innings pitched: 14 1/3
- Stats at Baseball Reference

Teams
- Chicago White Sox (1954)

Richard Bernard Strahs (December 4, 1923 – May 26, 1988) was an American professional baseball player, a right-handed pitcher who appeared in nine games for the 1954 Chicago White Sox. Born in Evanston, Illinois, Strahs stood 6 feet (1.8 m) tall and weighed 192 pounds (87 kg).

Strah was 30 years old and in his ninth season in the White Sox farm system when he was recalled from the Triple-A Charleston Senators in mid-1954. All of Strah's Major League appearances came as a relief pitcher. In his MLB debut, he retired the Boston Red Sox' Billy Consolo, Jimmy Piersall and Ted Williams in order in the eighth inning of a 5–2 loss at Fenway Park. On August 26, he was credited with his only save in the Majors when he retired the Philadelphia Athletics in order in the final inning of an 8–1 win at Connie Mack Stadium. Overall, Strahs appeared in 14 1/3 innings, surrendering 16 hits, nine earned runs and eight bases on balls. He also had eight strikeouts.

Strah's 11-season professional career lasted into the 1956 season. He posted a 107–88 record in 311 minor league games, all but 19 of them played in the White Sox system.
