= Ryan Lollis =

American baseball player (born 1986)

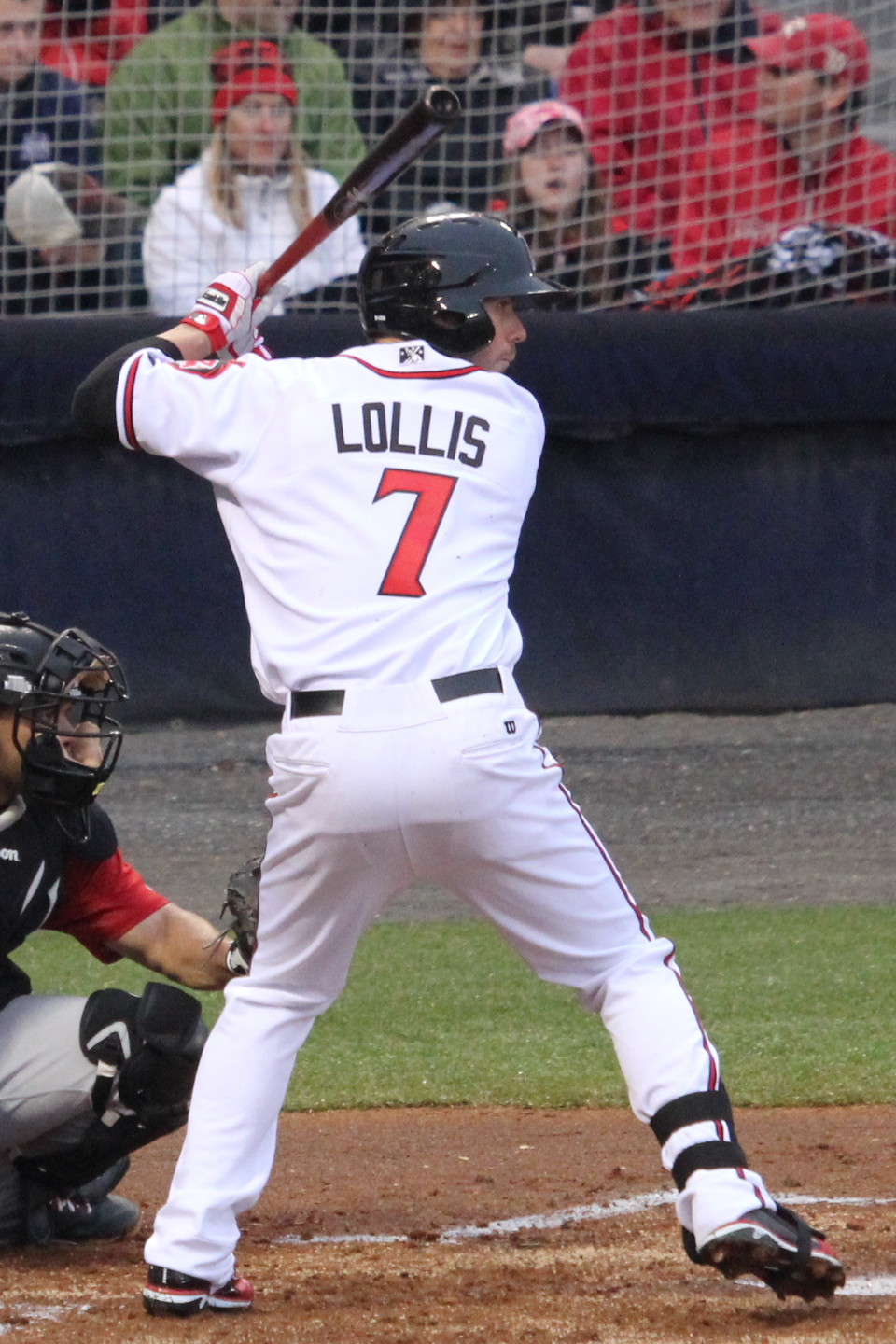
- Lollis batting for the Richmond Flying Squirrels, the Double-A affiliate of the Giants, in 2013
- Right fielder
- Born: December 16, 1986 (age 39); Houston, Texas, U.S.
- Batted: Left Threw: Left

MLB debut
- July 4, 2015, for the San Francisco Giants

Last MLB appearance
- August 20, 2015, for the San Francisco Giants

MLB statistics
- Batting average: .167
- Home runs: 0
- Runs batted in: 0
- Stats at Baseball Reference

Teams
- San Francisco Giants (2015)

Ryan Matthew Lollis (born December 16, 1986) is an American former professional baseball outfielder. He played in Major League Baseball (MLB) for the San Francisco Giants in 2015.

== Amateur career ==
Lollis was born in Houston, Texas and attended Houston Christian High School. He hit .520 with 10 homers and 57 RBI in high school, going 10-1 with a 1.11 ERA and 106 K as a pitcher. He was All-State his senior year. The Pittsburgh Pirates drafted him in the 20th round of the 2005 Major League Baseball draft, though he opted not to sign.

He went on to attend the University of Missouri, where he played college baseball for the Missouri Tigers from 2006 to 2009. He hit .327 with a .386 on-base percentage as a college freshman and .294 with a .396 slugging percentage as a sophomore. After the 2007 season, he played collegiate summer baseball with the Cotuit Kettleers of the Cape Cod Baseball League. His junior year, he hit .339 with a .440 OBP, 17 doubles and 48 runs in 60 games. He was then taken by the Detroit Tigers in the 20th round of the 2008 Major League Baseball draft, but once again did not ink a contract. As a senior, he hit .287 with 50 runs in 61 games and stole 15 bases in 16 tries.

== Professional career ==
Lollis was selected by the San Francisco Giants in the 37th round of the 2009 Major League Baseball draft, and began his professional career by posting a slash line of .312/.373/.427 with 62 hits in 52 games for the 2009 Salem-Keizer Volcanoes. In 2010, he batted .288/.345/.380 in 114 games for the Augusta Greenjackets. In 2011, he hit .303/.381/.399 with 10 stolen bases and 108 hits in 97 games split between the Greenjackets, San Jose Giants and Richmond Flying Squirrels. He batted .300/.364/.424 with 8 home runs, 60 RBI and 148 hits in 125 games split between San Jose and the Triple-A Fresno Grizzlies. In his first stint at Triple-A, he hit .309/.393/.434 in 50 games. He returned to Richmond for 2013, where he hit .267/.345/.377 with 125 hits in 136 games, fielding .983 in center field. He also played in the Venezuelan Winter League that year. Between San Jose and Richmond in 2014, Lollis hit .237 with four home runs and 28 RBI in 96 games.

The Giants promoted him to the major leagues on July 3, 2015, after he hit .345/.431/.478 in 30 games for San Jose, .471/.500/.529 in seven games with Richmond and .353/.422/.517 in 32 games for the Sacramento River Cats, the Giants' new Triple-A club. Between the teams, he batted .358/.431/.500. He made his major league debut on July 4, 2015, going 0-for-4 against the Washington Nationals. Lollis was optioned back to Triple-A Sacramento on July 7, after hitting 0-for-5 in 2 games. Lollis was called back up on August 13 when Nori Aoki went on the disabled list. In his second career start on August 18, 2015, Lollis got his first major league hit, off Tyler Lyons of the St. Louis Cardinals. Lollis was optioned back to Sacramento on August 22, and was designated for assignment on August 31. He elected free agency following the season on November 7, 2016.

Lollis split the 2017 season between Double–A Richmond and Triple–A Sacramento. In 113 combined games, he batted .263/.306/.323 with 1 home run and 35 RBI. Lollis elected free agency following the season on November 6, 2017.
