= Fairbury Shaners =

- 1915; Fairbury, Nebraska

Minor league affiliations
- Class: Class D (1915)
- League: Nebraska State League (1915)

Major league affiliations
- Team: None

Minor league titles
- League titles (0): None

Team data
- Name: Fairbury Shaners (1915)
- Ballpark: Fairbury City Park (1915)

The Fairbury Shaners were a minor league baseball team were based in Fairbury, Nebraska.

In 1915, the Shaners played as a member of the Class D level Nebraska State League. The league folded during the 1915 season with the Shaners in fourth place. When the Nebraska State League resumed play in 1922, the Fairbury Jeffersons began play in the reformed league.

The "Shaners" were nicknamed by local newspapers for their manager Bert Shaner.

Fairbury hosted minor league home games at Fairbury City Park, which is still in use today as a public park.

== History ==
Minor league baseball began in Fairbury, Nebraska in 1915, when the Fairbury "Shaners" became members of the eight–team Class D level Nebraska State League Fairbury replaced the Superior Brickmakers franchise in the league. Fairbury paid $400.00 for the Superior franchise, a price which included bats, balls and team uniforms. The former Superior uniforms were sold by Fairbury for $100.00.

Fairbury was managed by Bert Shaner in 1915, corresponding to the team "Shaners" nickname, given by local newspapers.

Fairbury was joined by the Beatrice Milkskimmers, Columbus Pawnees, Grand Island Champions, Hastings Reds, Kearney Buffaloes, Norfolk Drummers and York Prohibitionists in beginning Nebraska State League play on May 14, 1915.

The Shaners' home opener drew over 1,000 fans for the opening day festivities at Fairbury City Park. Fairbury Mayor Mason threw out the ceremonial first pitch, with Fairbury club president Wes Crawford serving as the catcher.

In their first season of minor league play, 1915 Fairbury placed fourth as the eight–team Nebraska State League. The 1915 league season saw tour of the eight teams fold during the season, before the league itself folded on July 18, 1915. When the league folded, the Shaners ended the season with a record of 22–31, playing the season under manager Bert Shaner. During the season, the Columbus, Grand Island, Kearney and Norfolk teams folded, leaving Fairbury in last place among the Nebraska State League's four remaining teams.

On July 18, 1915, the Shaners were 13.0 games behind the first place Beatrice Milkskimmers when the Nebraska State League folded. Beatrice (35–18) was followed by Hastings (30–27) and York (25–31) in finishing ahead of Fairbury.

Fremont, Nebraska native and former major league pitcher Harry Smith attended tryouts for the team before the season but did not appear on the final roster. Future major league players Eddie Brown and Lyman Lamb played for Fairbury in 1915. Brown was sold to the Mason City Claydiggers for $500.00 during the season, after hitting .314 in 35 games for Fairbury.

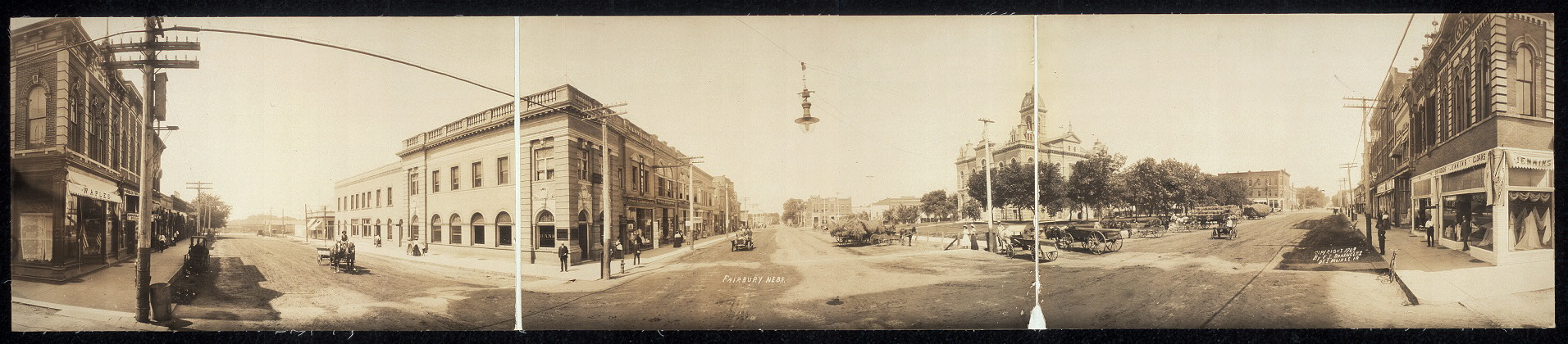
(1909) Panoramic View of Fairbury, Nebraska

After a seven–season hiatus, the 1922 Nebraska State League returned to play, with a Fairbury franchise resuming play. The 1922 Fairbury Jeffersons defeated Norfolk in the Finals to win the league championship.

== The ballpark ==
The Fairbury Shaners' home minor league ballpark in 1915 was City Park. Today, the Fairbury City Park is still in use as a public park with ballfields. The park is located at 421 Park Road in Fairbury, Nebraska.

== Year–by–year record ==
Year	Record	Finish	Manager	Playoffs / notes
1915	22–31	4th	Bert Shaner	League folded July 18

== Notable alumni ==
- Eddie Brown (1915)
- Lyman Lamb (1915)
- Harry Smith (1915)*
- Fairbury Shaners players
