= Columbus Pawnees =

- 1910–1915; Columbus, Nebraska

Minor league affiliations
- Class: Class D (1910–1915)
- League: Nebraska State League (1910–1915)

Major league affiliations
- Team: None

Minor league titles
- League titles (0): None

Team data
- Name: Columbus Discoverers (1910–1913); Columbus Pawnees (1914–1915)
- Ballpark: Unknown (1910–1915)

The Columbus Pawnees were a minor league baseball team based in Columbus, Nebraska. From 1910 to 1915, Columbus teams played exclusively as members of the Class D level Nebraska State League for their six seasons of minor league play. The "Pawnees" played in the 1914 and 1915 seasons, after the team was called Columbus "Discovers" from 1910 to 1913. After placing second in their first season, Columbus did not finish above fourth place in their remaining seasons, before the franchise folded during the 1915 season.

== History ==
In 1910, minor league baseball began in Columbus, Nebraska. The Columbus Discoverers became charter members of the reformed eight–team Class D level Nebraska State League. The Fremont Pathfinders, Grand Island Collegians, Hastings Brickmakers, Kearney Kapitalists, Red Cloud, Seward Statesmen and Superior Brickmakers joined Columbus in League play. The 1910 Nebraska State League set a salary limit of $900.00 and a roster limit of 12 players.

Sunday laws were in place in the region in the era. A meeting at the Congregational Church in Columbus was held on April 29, 1910, to discuss the issue. With about 50 men attending the meeting, it was reported that about 15 were against Sunday baseball and the rest were in favor of playing Sunday baseball in Columbus. Rev. William Dibble of the Congregational church, D Roush of the First Methodist Church and William Hackerman of the German Methodist Church represented local clergy and Columbus Discoverers team president Dan Schram represented the team at the meeting. The franchise indicated that they located the baseball park in a less than ideal area, so crowd and noise would not impact any of the residential areas of the town. County attorney Hensley was not opposed to playing baseball on Sunday. It was concluded that Sunday ball would not face organized opposition and the Nebraska State League scheduled Sunday games for Columbus.

In their first season of minor league play, the 1910 Columbus Discoverers placed second in the final Nebraska State League standings. The Discoverers ended the season with a record of 59–48, playing under manager Joe Norman. Columbus finished the season 4.5 games behind the first place Fremont Pathfinders in the final standings of the eight–team league.

In the 1911 season, the Columbus Discoverers continued play in the Class D level Nebraska State League. Columbus ended the season with a record of 52–60 to place sixth in the standings, playing under returning manager Joe Norman. The local paper noted attendance of 1,000 for the opening game, as the town had a population of about 5,000. Columbus finished 19.0 games behind the first place Superior Brickmakers in the final standings of the eight–team league.

The 1912 Columbus Discoverers placed fourth in the final eight–team Nebraska State League standings. With a record of 56–54, playing under managers Jack Palmer and Affie Wilson, the Discoverers finished 11.5 games behind the first place Hastings Brickmakers.

In 1913 Columbus Discoverers had a final regular season record of 54–58 to finish in sixth place in the eight–team Nebraska State League. Playing under managers John Gondling, Red Smyth and Jack Kraninger, Columbus finished 13.0 games behind the first place Kearney Kapitalists in the final Nebraska State League standings.

The 1914 Columbus "Pawnees" placed seventh in the eight–team Nebraska State League final standings. With a record of 49–63 under manager Jack Kraninger, the Pawnees finished 17.0 games behind the first place Grand Island Islanders in the Nebraska State League standings.

The Columbus, Nebraska use of the "Pawnee" moniker corresponds to the Pawnee Indian tribe that was from the region. Today, Pawnee Park is still in use as a public park in Columbus, opened in 1941.

In their final season of minor league play, the 1915 Columbus Pawnees folded during the season. On June 4, 1915, the Columbus Pawnees and the Kearney Buffaoles teams both disbanded on the same day. At the time the franchise folded, Columbus had a record of 3–13 under manager Frank Justus. The Nebraska State League folded on July 18, 1915 with the Beatrice Milkskimmers in first place after four teams of the eight–team league had folded.

Columbus, Nebraska has not hosted another minor league team.

== The ballpark ==
The name of the Columbus minor league teams' home ballpark is not directly referenced. In 1883, the "Columbus Athletic Association" was reportedly formed. The purpose of the association was said to be "to construct and maintain suitable grounds, buildings and the like for the holding and encouraging of games of baseball and all other athletics."

== Timeline ==
Year(s)	# Yrs.	Team	Level	League
1910–1913	4	Columbus Discoverers	Class D	Nebraska State League
1914–1915	2	Columbus Pawnees	Class D	Nebraska State League

== Year–by–year records ==
Year	Record	Finish	Manager	Playoffs/notes
1910	59–48	2nd	Joe Norman	No playoffs held
1911	52–60	6th	Joe Norman	No playoffs held
1912	56–54	4th	Jack Palmer / Affie Wilson	No playoffs held
1913	54–58	6th	John Gondling / Red Smyth / Jack Kraninger	No playoffs held
1914	49–63	7th	Jack Kraninger	No playoffs held
1915	3–13	NA	Frank Justus	Team folded June 4

== Notable alumni ==
- Joe Dolan (1910)
- Jack Ferry (1914)
- Raymond Haley (1910)
- Moxie Meixell (1910–1911)
- Red Smyth (1913, MGR)

=== See also ===
Columbus Discoverers players
Columbus Pawnees players
