= Nebraska State League =

American minor league baseball league

- Most recent season or competition: 1959 Nebraska State League season
- Classification: Class B (1892); Class D (1910–1915, 1922–1923, 1928–1938, 1956–1959)
- Sport: Minor League Baseball
- First season: 1892
- Folded: 1959
- President: Henry A. Sievers (1910–1911); A.C. Felt (1912–1913); Clarence J. Miles (1914–1915, 1922–1923); Richard R. Grotte (1923); James E. Beltzer (1928–1931); Robert C. Russell (1932); James E. Beltzer (1933); J. Roy Carter (1934–1938); Mike Hollinger (1956–1959)
- No. of teams: 22
- Country: United States of America
- Most titles: 4 McCook; Grand Island
- Related competitions: Western League; Tri-State League

The Nebraska State League (NSL) was an American professional minor league baseball league with five incarnations between 1892 and 1959. The Nebraska State League formed five times: in 1892, from 1910 to 1915, from 1922 to 1923, from 1928 to 1938 and from 1956 to 1959. League teams were based in Iowa, Kansas, Nebraska and South Dakota. The 1892 league was a Class B level league, and the league was a Class D level league in all subsequent seasons.

== History ==
=== Early seasons ===
The charter 1892 teams were the Beatrice Indians, Fremont, Grand Island Sugar Citys, Hastings, Lincoln Giants/Kearney and Plattsmouth. The league played just one season as a Class B level league before disbanding.

In 1889, a touring African-American baseball team called the "Lafayettes" was formed in Nebraska. In 1890, William Pope formed the Lincoln Giants. Pope had signed the best of the Lafayette players and the team subsequently folded. In 1892, the Lincoln Giants sought to join the Nebraska State League. Those against allowing black players in the league caused the Lincoln Giants to fold, with many of their players picked up by the other Nebraska State League teams.

The Nebraska State League in 1892 was racially integrated. Baseball Hall of Fame member Bud Fowler played for Kearney and was elected captain of the team. John W. Patterson, John Reeves, Frank Maupin, A.S. Kennedy, William Myers and F. Long played for Plattsmouth. George Taylor, played for Beatrice. The 1892 Nebraska State League was classified as a Class B level league and folded after the 1892 season.

The Nebraska State League reformed in 1910 as an eight–team Class D level league. The Columbus Discoverers, Fremont Pathfinders, Grand Island Collegians, Hastings Brickmakers, Kearney Kapitalists, Red Cloud, Seward Statesmen and Superior Brickmakers were the member franchises as the league resumed play.

In 1915, the Nebraska State League ran into financial difficulties as franchises struggled to remain solvent. Both Columbus and Kearney disbanded on June 4, 1915. After Grand Island withdrew June 28 and Norfolk disbanded June 29, the league folded on June 29, 1915. Kearney began the season 2,000 in debt and sold season tickets to eliminate the debt, but with 2,000 season tickets sold, the gameday gate money was minimal and the franchise was also affected by the city becoming "dry" and became unable to make its financial obligations to visiting teams. Kearney had logistical issuer as visiting teams were reluctant travel to Norfolk, as the train fares for the trip were expensive. Norfolk had agreed to pay extra to visiting clubs to make up the difference in train fares. Grand Island manager Harry Claire and player Crosby were given suspensions for the rest of the year due to gambling accusations and the team was also fined. The Grand Island franchise folded instead of paying the fines.

After folding following the 1915 season, the Nebraska State League reformed and played the 1922 and 1923 seasons with the Beatrice Blues, Fairbury Jeffersons, Grand Island Champions, Hastings Cubs, Lincoln Links and Norfolk Elk Horns as members of the six–team Class D level league. The league evolved into the 1924 Tri-State League.

In 1928, the Nebraska State League resumed play as an eight–team Class D level league. The Beatrice Blues, Fairbury Jeffersons, Grand Island Champs, Lincoln Links, McCook Generals, Norfolk Elks, North Platte Buffaloes and York Dukes were the 1928 league members. The league would play continually through the 1938 season.

=== 1956 to 1959 seasons ===
The Nebraska State League formed for the final time in 1956. The league teams were all major league affiliates, as the Class D level eight–team league resumed play. The league members all took the monikers of their affiliate, as the Grand Island A's, Hastings Giants, Holdrege White Sox, Kearney Yankees, Lexington Red Sox, McCook Braves, North Platte Indians and Superior Senators were the 1956 franchises.

Originally 12 cities had shown interest in hosting a team in the 1956 Nebraska State League. Thie interest occurred after the eight major league teams had agreed to affiliate with the league. The Nebraska cities of Ogallala, Alma, Broken Bow and Norton, Kansas, were not granted franchises.

The 1956 league schedule was designed to start on July 1 and end on Labor Day. The league structure began when representatives of the league held a meeting in Kearney, Nebraska, at the Fort Kearney Hotel in early June. The 1956 schedule was created by Harold George, secretary of the league. George was formerly an executive in the Western League. Mike Hollinger, a former manager of the semi–pro Kearney Irishmen team was named president of the League. Hollinger operated a bowling alley in Kearney.

In structuring the 1956 league, revenue and expenses were divided between Major League Baseball, the individual Major League parent clubs and each of the league franchises. League franchises committed to selling at least $5,000 in tickets and 500 season tickets before the season started. Kearney sold 760 season ticket books, McCook followed with 741. Holdrege sold 690, North Platte 673, Lexington 665, Grand Island 656, Hastings 632 and Superior 559. The league was owned by Major League Baseball. Season tickets were sold for $10.00 each. The revenue from the first 500 tickets per franchise went to the Nebraska State League ($5,000 per team). 25% of each season ticket went to the hosting team. Concessions were split evenly between the hosting team and the league. Each team city supplied a lighted home ballpark park and a groundskeeper. The official score keeper for each game was paid $2.50. Player and manager salaries and travel costs were handled by the parent major league affiliate, with Yellow Diamond and Continental Motor lines were hired as vendors to provide bus services. Players were allotted $2.25 per day for meal money. The league selected the Rawlings baseball as the official ball for the league, with the Major League affiliates providing balls. KGFW radio in Kearney paid $500.00 for radio rights to all Kearney games.

The last Nebraska State League of 1956–1959 was stable largely because its clubs were farm teams for the major leagues. Its final season has become well known through the book A False Spring by Pat Jordan, who played in the league for McCook.

The Nebraska State League was a Class B level league in the 1892 season and afterwards was exclusively a Class D level league.

== Cities represented ==
- Beatrice, NE: Beatrice Indians (1892); Beatrice Milkskimmers (1913–1915); Beatrice Blues (1922–1923, 1928, 1932–1938)
- Columbus, NE: Columbus (NE) Discoverers (1910–1913); Columbus Pawnees (1914–1915)
- Fairbury, NE: Fairbury Shaners (1915); Fairbury Jeffersons (1922–1923; 1928–1930); Fairbury Jeffs (1936–1937)
- Fremont, NE: Fremont (1892); Fremont Pathfinders (1910–1913)
- Grand Island, NE: Grand Island Sugar Citys (1892); Grand Island Collegians (1910–1913); Grand Island Islanders (1914); Grand Island Champions (1915); Grand Island Champions (1922–1923, 1928); Grand Island Islanders (1929–1932); Grand Island Red Birds (1937); Grand Island Cardinals (1938); Grand Island Athletics (1956–1959)
- Hastings, NE: Hastings (1892); Hastings Brickmakers (1910); Hastings Third Citys (1911–1913); Hastings Reds (1914–1915); Hastings Cubs (1922–1923); Hastings Giants (1956–1959)
- Holdrege, NE: Holdrege White Sox (1956–1959)
- Kearney, NE: Kearney (1892); Kearney Kapitalists (1910); Kearney Buffaloes (1911); Kearney Kapitalists (1912–1914); Kearney Buffaloes (1915); Kearney Yankees (1956–1959)
- Lexington, NE: Lexington Red Sox (1956–1958)
- Lincoln, NE: Lincoln Giants (1892); Lincoln Links (1922–1923, 1928–1935); Lincoln Red Links (1936); Lincoln Links (1938)
- McCook, NE: McCook Generals (1928–1932); McCook Braves (1956–1959)
- Mitchell, SD: Mitchell Kernels (1936–1937)
- Norfolk, NE: Norfolk Drummers (1914–1915); Norfolk Elk Horns (1922–1923); Norfolk Elkhorns (1928–1932); Norfolk Elks (1933); Norfolk Elkhorns (1934–1935); Norfolk Elks (1936–1937); Norfolk Elkhorns (1938)
- North Platte, NE: North Platte Buffaloes (1928–1932); North Platte Indians (1956–1959)
- Norton, KS: Norton Jayhawks (1929–1930)
- Plattsmouth, NE: Plattsmouth (1892)
- Red Cloud, NE: Red Cloud (1910)
- Seward, NE: Seward Statesmen (1910–1913)
- Sioux City, IA: Sioux City Cowboys (1938)
- Sioux Falls, SD: Sioux Falls Canaries (1933–1938)
- Superior, NE: Superior Brickmakers (1910–1914); Superior Senators (1956–1958)
- York, NE: York Prohibitionists (1911–1915); York Dukes (1928–1931)

== Standings & statistics ==
=== 1892 ===
1892 Nebraska State League

Team	W	L	GB	Pct.	Manager
Beatrice Indians	27	20	–	.574	NA
Grand Island Sugar Citys	25	25	3½	.500	Pa Rourke
Lincoln Giants / Kearney, NE	18	21	5	.462	NA
Hastings, NE	17	20	5	.459	NA
Fremont Pathfinders	11	18	9	.379	NA
Plattsmouth, NE	11	24	11	.314	NA

League disbanded in July.

=== 1910 to 1915 ===
1910 Nebraska State League

Team standings	W	L	PCT	GB	Attend	Managers
Fremont Pathfinders	63	43	.594	–	16,966	Pug Bennett
Columbus Discoverers	59	48	.551	4½	14,110	Joe Dolan
Kearney Kapitalists	60	51	.541	5½	14,946	Clarence Murphy
Grand Island Collegians	60	52	.536	6	20,129	Buck Beltzer
Superior Brickmakers	56	54	.509	9	13,150	Dennis Bockewitz
Seward Statesmen	50	62	.446	16	10,251	John Fink
Red Cloud "Indians"	47	62	.431	17½	10,126	B.F. Grant
Hastings Brickmakers	42	65	.398	21½	14,318	George Harms

No playoffs held

Player statistics
Player	Team	Stat	Tot	Player	Team	Stat	Tot
Fred Jarrott	Red Cloud	BA	.326	Win Noyes	Kearney	W	24
Leo Cook	Hastings	Runs	88	Win Noyes	Kearney	SO	323
Fred Jarrott	Red Cloud	Hits	126	Frank Green	Kearney	Pct	.900; 9–1
Fresco Thompson	Fremont	HR	10	Archie Turpin	Fremont	SB	75

1911 Nebraska State League

Team standings	W	L	PCT	GB	Managers
Superior Brickmakers	70	40	.636	–	Dennis Bockewitz
Fremont Pathfinders	69	43	.616	2	Pug Bennett
Hastings Third Citys	54	58	.482	17	Rudy Kling
Seward Statesmen	53	57	.482	17	John Fink
Grand Island Collegians	52	60	.464	19	Howard Armstrong
Columbus Discoverers	52	60	.464	19	Joe Dolan
Kearney Buffaloes	48	64	.429	23	Clarence Murphy
York Prohibitionists	48	64	.429	23	George Harms / Lefty Davis

No playoffs held

Player statistics
Player	Team	Stat	Tot	Player	Team	Stat	Tot
Norm Coyle	Superior	BA	.354	Al Orth	Hastings	W	23
Nick Allen	Superior	Runs	95	Harry Smith	Fremont	SO	235
Norm Coyle	Superior	Hits	153	Jim Stevens	Superior	Pct	.750; 18–6
George Harms	York	HR	21				

1912 Nebraska State League

Team standings	W	L	PCT	GB	Managers
Hastings Third Citys	67	44	.604	–	Bert Shaner
Fremont Pathfinders	66	45	.595	1	Pug Bennett
Kearney Kapitalists	63	49	.563	4½	Harry Berte
Columbus Discoverers	56	54	.509	10½	Jim Palmer / Willie Wilson
Seward Statesmen	53	59	.473	14½	Bill Zink
Grand Island Collegians	52	59	.468	15	Jim Cockman
York Prohibitionists	45	66	.405	22	Lefty Davis
Superior Brickmakers	43	69	.384	24½	Dennis Bockewitz

A Kearney win over Hastings reversed at the 1913 spring meeting. Hastings awarded league championship.
No playoffs held

Player statistics
Player	Team	Stat	Tot	Player	Team	Stat	Tot
Pug Bennett	Fremont	BA	.360	Joe Lotz	Kearney	W	26
Charles Block	York	Runs	116	Bert Shaner	Hastings	Pct	.773; 17–5
Bill Zink	Seward	Hits	139				

1913 Nebraska State League

Team standings	W	L	PCT	GB	Managers
Kearney Kapitalists	67	45	.598	–	Harry Berte
Hastings Third Citys	64	48	.571	3	Bert Shaner
York Prohibitionists	57	55	.509	10	Gid Gardner
Fremont Pathfinders	56	56	.500	11	Curt Welch
Superior Brickmakers	54	58	.482	13	Dennis Bockewitz
Columbus Discoverers	54	58	.482	13	John Gondling / Red Smith / Jack Kraninger
Seward Statesmen / Beatrice Milkskimmers	52	60	.464	15	Bill Zink
Grand Island Collegians	44	68	.393	23	O.J. Firestine / Jack Forrester

Seward (27–37) moved to Beatrice July 21.
No playoffs held

Player statistics
Player	Team	Stat	Tot	Player	Team	Stat	Tot
Homer W. "Dolly" Gray	Kearney	BA	.411	R.N. Maples	Kearney	W	17
Swat McCabe	Hastings	Hits	155	L.R. Plympton	Kearney	W	17
Ted Reed	Columbus	Pct	.737; 14–5	Berney Everton	York	W	17

1914 Nebraska State League

Team standings	W	L	PCT	GB	Managers
Grand Island Islanders	66	46	.589	–	Harry Claire
Beatrice Milkskimmers	65	47	.580	1	Frank Coe
Hastings Reds	64	48	.571	2	Pug Bennett
York Prohibitionists	60	52	.536	6	Maury Pierce
Superior Brickmakers	54	58	.482	12	James Feeney / F.H. Bigby
Norfolk Drummers	52	60	.464	14	Warren Cummings / Babe Towne
Columbus Pawnees	49	63	.437	17	Jake Kraninger
Kearney Kapitalists	38	74	.339	28	Harry Berte

No playoffs held

Player statistics
Player	Team	Stat	Tot	Player	Team	Stat	Tot
Jake Gettman	Hastings	BA	.336	John McDonnell	Beatrice	W	21
Clint Neff	Beatrice	Runs	80	Dazzy Vance	Hastings	SO	194
Fred Payne	Grand Island	Hits	134	Dazzy Vance	Hastings	Pct	.810; 17–4
Clint Neff	Beatrice	HR	19				

1915 Nebraska State League

Team standings	W	L	PCT	GB	Managers
Beatrice Milkskimmers	35	18	.660	–	John Fillman
Hastings Reds	30	27	.526	7	Pug Bennett
York Prohibitionists	25	31	.446	11½	Maury Pierce
Fairbury Shaners	22	31	.415	13	Bert Shaner
Norfolk Drummers	24	13	.649	NA	Babe Towne
Grand Island Champions	16	16	.500	NA	Harry Claire
Kearney Buffaloes	4	10	.286	NA	Grover Matney
Columbus Pawnees	3	13	.188	NA	Frank Justus

Columbus and Kearney folded June 4; Grand Island and Norfolk folded June 28.
League folded July 18.

=== 1922 to 1923 ===
1922 Nebraska State League

Team standings	W	L	PCT	GB	Managers
Norfolk Elk Horns	70	48	.593	–	Bert Adams / Runt Marr
Lincoln Links	70	49	.588	½	O.A. Beltzer
Fairbury Jeffersons	69	49	.585	1	George Segrist
Beatrice Blues	53	63	.457	16	R. Kirchner / Ducky Holmes
Hastings Cubs	52	67	.437	18½	Al Smith
Grand Island Champions	40	78	.339	30	Ed Willett

Playoff: Fairbury 4 games, Norfolk 3.

Player statistics
Player	Team	Stat	Tot	Player	Team	Stat	Tot
Runt Marr	Norfolk	BA	.364	Bill Bailey	Lincoln	W	23
Runt Marr	Norfolk	Runs	116	Fred Wigington	Hastings	SO	260
Runt Marr	Norfolk	Hits	167	L.W. Jenney	Fairbury	Pct	.773; 17–5
Claude Mitchell	Norfolk	HR	21				

1923 Nebraska State League

Team standings	W	L	PCT	GB	Managers
Lincoln Links	71	64	.526	–	O.A. Beltzer
Norfolk Elk Horns	68	66	.507	2½	Ed Reichle
Grand Island Champions	68	66	.507	2½	Leo McDonnell / Boser
Hastings Cubs	65	66	.498	4	Pug Bennett
Beatrice Blues	64	68	.485	5½	Ed Willett / Matty McGrath
Fairbury Jeffersons	63	69	.477	6½	George Segrist

No playoffs held

Player statistics
Player	Team	Stat	Tot	Player	Team	Stat	Tot
Fred Conkey	Lincoln	BA	.390	Art Stokes	Lincoln	W	23
Fresco Thompson	Grand Island	Runs	91	Art Stokes	Lincoln	SO	207
Fred Conkey	Lincoln	Hits	169	Edward Shupe	Grand Island	Pct	.720; 18–7
Jimmy Hudgens	Fairbury	HR	13				

=== 1928 to 1938 ===
1928 Nebraska State League

Team standings	W	L	PCT	GB	Managers
McCook Generals	71	49	.592	–	Elmer "Doc" Bennett
Lincoln Links	66	54	.550	5	Bob Brown
Beatrice Blues	64	56	.533	7	Hal Brokaw
North Platte Buffaloes	64	57	.529	7½	Joe Pizer
York Dukes	58	62	.483	13	Art Rasmussen
Norfolk Elkhorns	55	66	.455	16½	Lefty Wilkus
Grand Island Champs	52	68	.433	19	Davey Claire / Alf Pierpoint / Thomson / Clay Schoonover
Fairbury Jeffersons	51	69	.425	20	Lee Fairchild

No playoffs held

Player statistics
Player	Team	Stat	Tot	Player	Team	Stat	Tot
John Stoneham	McCook	BA	.396	Ernest Krenk	Lincoln	W	20
Herb Pember	McCook	Runs	116	Harlan Pyle	McCook	W	20
Herb Pember	McCook	Hits	172	Joe Wilman	York	SO	164
Walt Cookson	North Platte	HR	19	Ernest Krenk	Lincoln	ERA	2.57

1929 Nebraska State League

Team standings	W	L	PCT	GB	Managers
McCook Generals	74	42	.638	–	Elmer "Doc" Bennett
Fairbury Jeffersons	70	51	.579	6½	Preston Gray
Lincoln Links	68	51	.571	7½	Bob Brown / Les Nunamaker
York Dukes	61	53	.535	12	Art Rasmussen
Norton Jayhawks	54	60	.474	19	Hal Brokaw
Grand Island Islanders	54	62	.466	20	Clay Schoonover / Bob Brown
Norfolk Elkhorns	43	73	.371	31	Lefty Wilkus
North Platte Buffaloes	42	74	.362	32	Joe Pizer

No playoffs held

Player statistics
Player	Team	Stat	Tot	Player	Team	Stat	Tot
John Stoneham	McCook	BA	.410	Andy Bednar	McCook	W	21
Herb Pember	McCook	Runs	117	Stanford Primm	Fairbury	W	21
Herb Pember	McCook	Hits	194	Vito SanFilippo	Fairbury	SO	201
Joe Smith	Norfolk	HR	15	Jean Jones	Norton	ERA	2.15

1930 Nebraska State League

Team standings	W	L	PCT	GB	Managers
McCook Generals	85	34	.714	–	Elmer "Doc" Bennett
Fairbury Jeffersons	68	51	.571	1	Preston Gray
Grand Island Islanders	62	58	.517	23½	Kenzie Kirkham
York Dukes	60	59	.504	25	Art Rasmussen
North Platte Buffaloes	60	60	.500	25½	Baldy Fowlkes
Norfolk Elkhorns	56	65	.463	30	Hal Brokaw
Lincoln Links	56	66	.459	30½	Les Nunamaker
Norton Jayhawks	33	87	.275	52½	Earl Harrison / Frank Sidle

Norton suspended operations August 25; final seven games were forfeited to scheduled opponents.
No playoffs held

Player statistics
Player	Team	Stat	Tot	Player	Team	Stat	Tot
Washington Seelman	North Platte	BA	.373	Vito SanFilippo	Fairbury	W	23
Ed Taylor	Lincoln	Runs	125	Vito SanFilippo	Fairbury	SO	243
Washington Seelman	North Platte	Hits	174	Jim Cameron	McCook	ERA	2.25
Mike Kreevich	McCook	HR	15	Jim Cameron	McCook	Pct	.925; 19–2

1931 Nebraska State League

Team standings	W	L	PCT	GB	Managers
Grand Island Islanders	66	41	.617	–	Sonny Brookhaus
McCook Generals	59	50	.541	8	Elmer "Doc" Bennett
Lincoln Links	55	51	.519	10½	Les Nunamaker
North Platte Buffaloes	53	55	.491	13½	Bart Green / Frank Owens
Norfolk Elkhorns	47	58	.448	18	Joe McDermott
York Dukes	42	67	.385	25	Pop Gleason / Bob Brown

Playoffs: Grand Island 4 games, North Platte 1.

Player statistics
Player	Team	Stat	Tot	Player	Team	Stat	Tot
Ignatius Walters	McCook	BA	.400	Harry Matuzak	McCook	W	18
Roy Kippert	Grand Is/McCook	Runs	117	Harley Hagan	Lincoln	SO	189
Ignatius Walters	McCook	Hits	193	Robert Pickering	Grand Island	ERA	2.56
Sebastian Wagner	Norfolk	HR	22				

1932 Nebraska State League

Team standings	W	L	PCT	GB	Managers
Norfolk Elkhorns	75	35	.682	–	Joe McDermott
Beatrice Blues	59	46	.562	13½	Dick Reichle / Sonny Brookhaus
Grand Island Islanders	59	52	.532	16½	Sonny Brookhaus / Gus Getz
North Platte Buffaloes	49	61	.454	26	Frank Owens
Lincoln Links	45	60	.429	27½	William Rumler / Bob Sanquist
McCook Generals	37	70	.346	36½	Gene Bailey / Jack Hruska

Playoffs: Beatrice 2 games, Lincoln 1. Finals: Beatrice 4 games, Norfolk 3.

Player statistics
Player	Team	Stat	Tot	Player	Team	Stat	Tot
Walt Gannon	Norfolk	BA	.355	Otto Davis	Norfolk	W	24
Johnny Cross	Beatrice	Runs	100	Pat Flanagan	McCook	SO	261
Walt Gannon	Norfolk	Hits	150	Luke Bucklin	Norfolk	ERA	1.89
Bill Swinger	Beatrice	HR	16				

1933 Nebraska State League

Team standings	W	L	PCT	GB	Managers
Norfolk Elks	60	45	.571	–	Joe McDermott
Beatrice Blues	60	46	.566	½	Sonny Brookhaus
Sioux Falls Canaries	57	49	.538	3½	Rex Stucker
Lincoln Links	34	71	.324	26	Elmer "Doc" Bennett / Joe Hruska

Playoffs: Beatrice 5 games, Norfolk 4.

Player statistics
Player	Team	Stat	Tot	Player	Team	Stat	Tot
Don Gutteridge	Lincoln	BA	.360	Wilmer Schroeder	Sioux Falls	W	20
Larry Getz	Beatrice	Runs	100	Mike Pociask	Beatrice	SO	195
Ray Bertram	Norfolk	Hits	152	Sam Conaway	Sioux Falls	ERA	2.43
Howard Moore	Beatrice	HR	19				

1934 Nebraska State League

Team standings	W	L	PCT	GB	Managers
Lincoln Links	69	41	.627	–	Cy Lingle / Pug Griffin
Norfolk Elkhorns	60	49	.550	8½	Joe McDermott
Sioux Falls Canaries	50	60	.455	19	Rex Stucker
Beatrice Blues	38	67	.362	28½	Sonny Brookhaus

No playoffs held

Player statistics
Player	Team	Stat	Tot	Player	Team	Stat	Tot
Buck Ewing	Norfolk	BA	.360	Jack Farmer	Norfolk	W	19
Frank Morehouse	Lincoln	Runs	99	Tom Seats	Lincoln	SO	221
George Silvey	Norfolk	Hits	143	Nels Potter	Lincoln	ERA	1.71
Bill Swinger	Beatrice	HR	14				

1935 Nebraska State League

Team standings	W	L	PCT	GB	Managers
Sioux Falls Canaries	72	40	.643	–	Ralph Brandon
Norfolk Elkhorns	58	49	.542	11½	Pat Patterson
Lincoln Links	50	64	.439	23	Cy Lingle
Beatrice Blues	42	69	.378	29½	Charley Stis / Bennie Warren

Playoffs: Norfolk 4 games, Sioux Falls 3.

Player statistics
Player	Team	Stat	Tot	Player	Team	Stat	Tot
Ash Joerndt	Beatrice	BA	.331	Claude Bradford	Sioux Falls	W	17
Justin Keenoy	Beatrice	Runs	100	Orie Arntzen	Norfolk	SO	184
Ash Joerndt	Beatrice	Hits	153	Tony A. Johnson	Sioux Falls	ERA	2.14
Bill Swinger	Beatrice	HR	22	John Grilli	Norfolk	RBI	102

1936 Nebraska State League

Team standings	W	L	PCT	GB	Managers
Sioux Falls Canaries	71	49	.592	–	Ralph Brandon
Mitchell Kernels	68	50	.576	2	Cliff Knox
Norfolk Elks	63	57	.525	8	Joe McDermott
Beatrice Blues	56	65	.463	15½	Sonny Brookhaus
Lincoln Red Links	26	38	.406	NA	Pid Purdy
Fairbury Jeffs	19	44	.302	NA	Eddie Brown

Lincoln and Fairbury disbanded July 16.
Playoffs: Sioux Falls 3 games, Beatrice 2: Mitchell 3 games, Norfolk 1. Finals: Mitchell 4 games, Sioux Falls 2.

Player statistics
Player	Team	Stat	Tot	Player	Team	Stat	Tot
Marvin Pelton	Mitchell	BA	.373	Charlie Wagner	Sioux Falls	W	21
Bill B. James	Norfolk	Runs	137	Robert Swan	Sioux Falls	SO	267
Bert Haas	Beatrice	Hits	178	Charlie Wagner	Sioux Falls	ERA	3.08
Bill B. James	Norfolk	HR	29	Dexter Savage	Norfolk	RBI	128

1937 Nebraska State League

Team standings	W	L	PCT	GB	Managers
Sioux Falls Canaries	83	36	.697	–	Ralph Brandon
Mitchell Kernels	75	41	.647	6½	Cliff Knox
Beatrice Blues	54	61	.470	27	Lee Riley
Norfolk Elks	50	65	.435	31	Elmer "Doc" Bennett
Fairbury Jeffs	48	70	.407	34½	Sonny Brookhaus
Grand Island Red Birds	40	77	.342	42	Joe McDermott

No playoffs held

Player statistics
Player	Team	Stat	Tot	Player	Team	Stat	Tot
Lee Riley	Beatrice	BA	.372	Charlie Wagner	Sioux Falls	W	25
Frank Mahacek	Sioux Falls	Runs	129	Murry Dickson	Grand Island	SO	209
James Guyman	Mitchell	Hits	175	Bobby Swan	Sioux Falls	ERA	2.35
James Guyman	Mitchell	HR	22	Harold Schmiel	Sioux Falls	RBI	140

1938 Nebraska State League

Team standings	W	L	PCT	GB	Managers
Sioux City Cowboys	70	47	.598	–	Pete Monahan
Norfolk Elkhorns	67	49	.578	2½	Elmer "Doc" Bennett
Beatrice Blues	62	54	.534	7½	Lee Riley
Lincoln Links	52	64	.448	17½	Pug Griffin
Grand Island Cardinals	49	67	.422	20½	Joe Hassler
Sioux Falls Canaries	49	68	.419	21	Ralph Brandon

Playoffs: Norfolk 4 games, Sioux City 2.

Player statistics
Player	Team	Stat	Tot	Player	Team	Stat	Tot
Lee Riley	Beatrice	BA	.365	Don Fisher	Sioux Falls	W	21
Ralph Fallon	Sioux City	Runs	124	Don Fisher	Sioux Falls	SO	242
Marion DeJarnett	Lincoln	Runs	124	Cletus Voss	Sioux Falls	ERA	2.33
Ned Tighe	Norfolk	Hits	161	Lee Riley	Beatrice	RBI	122
Pete Monahan	Sioux City	HR	19				

=== 1956 to 1959 ===
1956 Nebraska State League

Team standings	W	L	PCT	GB	Attend	Managers
Lexington Red Sox	41	22	.651	–	28,393	Danny Doyle
Grand Island Athletics	35	28	.556	6	30,915	Art Mazmanian
Kearney Yankees	35	28	.556	6	30,943	Randy Gumpert
McCook Braves	35	28	.556	6	32,224	Bill Steinecke
Superior Senators	34	29	.540	7	22,860	Charles Ray Baker
Holdrege White Sox	33	30	.524	8	24,326	Skeeter Scalzi
North Platte Indians	24	39	.381	17	28,578	Spencer Harris
Hastings Giants	15	48	.238	26	28,713	Gene Thompson

No playoffs held

Player statistics
Player	Team	Stat	Tot	Player	Team	Stat	Tot
Bill Fries	Kearney	BA	.394	Ted Ellis	Lexington	W	11
Deron Johnson	Kearney	Runs	70	Dick Allen	McCook	W	11
Jimmie Hall	Superior	Runs	87	Gary Peters	Holdrege	SO	142
Deron Johnson	Kearney	RBI	78	Ted Ellis	Lexington	ERA	1.76
Deron Johnson	Kearney	HR	24				

1957 Nebraska State League

Team standings	W	L	PCT	GB	Attend	Managers
Grand Island Athletics	33	22	.600	–	26,982	Art Mazmanian
Holdrege White Sox	33	23	.589	½	21,581	Frank Parenti
Lexington Red Sox	33	23	.589	½	24,218	Jack Kaiser
Kearney Yankees	30	26	.536	3½	23,349	Randy Gumpert
Hastings Giants	29	26	.527	4	21,863	Leo Schrall
McCook Braves	27	29	.482	6½	25,844	Bill Steinecke
Superior Senators	27	29	.482	6½	19,796	Charles Ray Baker
North Platte Indians	11	45	.196	22½	21,207	Rudy York

No playoffs held

Player statistics
Player	Team	Stat	Tot	Player	Team	Stat	Tot
James Wasem	Holdrege	BA	.366	Wayne Coughtry	Lexington	W	11
Don Bonomini	Holdrege	Runs	58	Leonardo Ferguson	Kearney	SO	149
Jackie Creed	Lexington	Hits	71	Leonardo Ferguson	Kearney	ERA	1.68
Milt Campo	Kearney	RBI	59	Milt Campo	Kearney	HR	17

1958 Nebraska State League

Team standings	W	L	PCT	GB	Attend	Managers
North Platte Indians	41	22	.651	–	18,766	Mark Wylie
McCook Braves	40	23	.635	1	17,372	Bill Steinecke
Grand Island Athletics	33	30	.524	8	18,762	Art Mazmanian
Kearney Yankees	33	30	.524	8	14,147	Randy Gumpert
Lexington Red Sox	30	33	.476	11	12,838	Jack Kaiser
Holdrege White Sox	29	34	.460	12	11,565	George Noga
Hastings Giants	24	39	.381	17	11,522	Leo Schrall
Superior Senators	22	41	.349	19	8,953	Hal Keller

No playoffs held

Player statistics
Player	Team	Stat	Tot	Player	Team	Stat	Tot
Ron Debus	Grand Island	BA	.393	Ceferino Foy	McCook	W	10
Larry Bulla	North Platte	Runs	68	Larry Gansauer	North Platte	W	10
Jerry McNertney	Holdrege	Hits	84	Bill Spanswick	Lexington	SO	1.42
J. Keith Williams	North Platte	RBI	72	Larry Del Margo	Kearney	ERA	2.25
J. Keith Williams	North Platte	HR	12				

1959 Nebraska State League

Team standings	W	L	PCT	GB	Attend	Managers
McCook Braves	43	19	.694	–	19,788	Bill Steinecke
Holdrege White Sox	39	23	.629	4	11,963	Frank Parenti
Grand Island Athletics	32	30	.516	11	16,716	Art Mazmanian
Kearney Yankees	27	35	.435	16	13,141	Jim Gleeson
Hastings Giants	23	39	.371	20	10,235	Leo Schrall
North Platte Indians	22	40	.355	21	14,275	Mark Wylie

No playoffs held

Player statistics
Player	Team	Stat	Tot	Player	Team	Stat	Tot
Ike Futch	Kearney	BA	.319	Anthony Filicchia	Grand Island	W	11
Frank Saia	McCook	Runs	63	Dennis Overby	McCook	SO	136
Woody Huyke	Hastings	Hits	71	Paul Chenger	McCook	ERA	2.13
Boyd Coffie	Kearney	RBI	63	Woody Huyke	Hastings	HR	12

== Hall of Fame alumni ==
- Fred Clarke, 1892, Hastings
- Bud Fowler, 1892, Kearney
- Jim Kaat, 1957, Superior Senators
- Phil Niekro, 1959, McCook Braves
- Dazzy Vance, 1912–1913, Superior Brickmakers; 1914, Hastings Reds

== Sources ==
- The Encyclopedia of Minor League Baseball: Second Edition.
- This article incorporates content from the "Nebraska State League" article at the Baseball-Reference.com Bullpen. The Bullpen is a wiki, and its content is available under the GNU Free Documentation License.
