= Norton Jayhawks =

- 1929–1930; Norton, Kansas

Minor league affiliations
- Class: Class D (1929–1930)
- League: Nebraska State League (1929–1930)

Major league affiliations
- Team: None

Minor league titles
- League titles (0): None

Team data
- Name: Norton Jayhawks (1929–1930)
- Ballpark: Elmwood Park (1929–1930)

The Norton Jayhawks were a minor league baseball team based in Norton, Kansas. The "Jayhawks" played in the 1929 and 1930 seasons as members of the Class D level Nebraska State League and were the first and only minor league team based in Norton. The Jayhawks hosted home minor league games at Elmwood Park.

== History ==
Norton gained a minor league team during the 1929 season when the Beatrice Blues franchise of the Class D level Nebraska State League moved from Beatrice, Nebraska to Norton, Kansas. Norton had previously sought admission to the Nebraska State League, but had been denied. The Norton Jayhawks then played the 1929 and 1930 seasons in the Nebraska State League. The stock market crash of 1928 greatly affected minor league baseball as The Great Depression gripped the nation, subsequently 12 of the existing 26 baseball minor leagues folded between 1928 and 1933. The Nebraska State League was able to keep playing, but it folded the Jayhawks on August 25, 1930, with seven games remaining. Another league member, the Fairbury Jeffersons, were folded after the 1930 season.

After gaining a franchise during the season, the Norton "Jayhawks" joined the Fairbury Jeffersons, Grand Island Islanders, Lincoln Links, McCook Generals, Norfolk Elkhorns, North Platte Buffaloes and York Dukes teams in Nebraska State League play.

In their first season of play, the 1929 Beatrice/Norton team ended the season in fifth place in the eight–team Nebraska State League standings. The Beatrice/Norton team ended the season with a 54–60 overall record, playing the 1929 season under manager Hal Brokaw in both locations. Norton finished 19.0 games behind the first place McCook Generals in the final Nebraska State League standings.

The Norton Jayhawks franchise continued play in 1930 but folded days before the end of the eight-team Nebraska State League season. The Norton franchise folded on August 25, 1930, and the final seven games of the season were forfeited, as the Nebraska State League continued play through August 31, 1930. With their seven forfeit games included, Norton finished last in the eight–team league with a 33–87 final record. Managed by Earl Harrison and Frank Sidle, the Jayhawks finished 52.5 games behind the first place McCook Generals.

After Norton permanently folded during the 1930 season, Norton did not return to the 1931 Nebraska State League, which reduced to become a six team league. Norton, Kansas has not hosted another minor league team.

== The ballpark ==
The Norton Jayhawks hosted home minor league games at Elmwood Park. Today, the park is still in use as a public park with ballfields. Elmwood Park is located at 400 South State in Norton, Kansas.

== Timeline ==
Year(s)	# Yrs.	Team	Level	League	Ballpark
1929–1930	2	Norton Jayhawks	Class D	Nebraska State League	Elmwood Park

== Year–by–year records ==
Year	Record	Finish	Manager	Playoffs
1929	54–60	5th	Hal Brokaw	No playoffs held
1930	33–87	8th	Earl Harrison / Frank Sidle	Team folded August 25 (33–80); Last seven games forfeited

== Notable alumni ==
- Spud Owen (1929).
