= Fremont Pathfinders =

- 1892–1913; (1892, 1910–1913); Fremont, Nebraska

Minor league affiliations
- Class: Class B (1892); Class D (1910–1913)
- League: Nebraska State League (1892, 1910–1913)

Major league affiliations
- Team: None

Minor league titles
- League titles (2): 1910; 1912*

Team data
- Name: Fremont (1892); Fremont Pathfinders (1910–1913)
- Ballpark: Association Lot (1910–1913)

The Fremont Pathfinders were a minor league baseball team, based in Fremont, Nebraska. Preceded by a Fremont team in 1892, Fremont teams played exclusively as members of the Nebraska State League. The Pathfinders won league championships in their first season of 1910 and a second in 1912, before folding following the 1913 season, when the franchise relocated and became the Norfolk Drummers. Fremont played minor league home games at the Association Lot.

In 2019, the Fremont Moo, a Collegiate summer baseball franchise, began play.

== History ==
Fremont briefly had a minor league team in 1892, playing as charter members of the six–team Class B level Nebraska State League. On June 20, 1892, Fremont had compiled a record of 11–18 under Manager Norman L. Baker when the franchise disbanded. The 1892 Nebraska State League, which was an integrated league, fully disbanded in July, 1892.

In 1910, minor league baseball returned to Fremont, when the Pathfinders became charter members of the reformed Class D level Nebraska State League. Other members of the eight–team league were the Columbus Discoverers, Grand Island Collegians, Hastings Brickmakers, Kearney Kapitalists, Red Cloud, Seward Statesmen and Superior Brickmakers. The 1910 Nebraska State League set a salary limit of $900.00 and a roster limit of 12.

In their first season, the Pathfinders won the 1910 Nebraska State League Championship. On September 4, 1910, Fremont pitcher Sullivan Campbell threw a no–hitter in a 5–0 victory over the Seward Statesmen. The Pathfinders finished 63–42 in 1910, 4.5 games ahead of the second place Columbus Discoverers. There were no playoffs. Manager, L.D. "Pug" Bennett, also pitched and played outfield. Fremont drew 16,966 fans, an average of 320 per game.

On opening day 1911, all Fremont businesses were closed and students released from school to participate in a parade to the ballpark and attend the game. This parade had become an opening day tradition. Fremont held a "pennant day" in 1911, unveiling an 18–foot banner for the 1910 championship. In the 1911 season, Fremont ended the season with a 69–43 regular season record under Manager L.D. Bennett, placing second, finishing 2.0 games behind the first place Superior Brickmakers. Fremont had contentious games with Superior, leading to Superior appealing to the president of the league to reverse some losses. The Superior appeal was denied.

The 1912 Fremont Pathfinders ended the season in a controversial 1st place tie. Both Fremont and the Hastings Brickmakers played to a 66–45 regular season final records, which left them in a 1st place tie. The Fremont manager was again L.D. Bennett. At the conclusion of the season, Fremont and Hastings both had claims against each other involving roster inflation, teams losing games against the other on purpose and forfeited games. The Nebraska State League called a meeting of directors, who reviewed the accusations and declared the two teams in a tie. The teams wished to play a playoff series. The league president ruled that a playoff series would have the first two games in Hastings, but Fremont disagreed, wanting the first two games at Fremont. Fremont refused to play, the situation was not resolved, and no playoffs were held to break the tie.

At the 1913 Nebraska State League spring league meetings, a 1912 Kearney win over Hastings was reversed. This reversal gave Hastings a 1912 record of 67–44, one game ahead of Fremont. Fremont pitcher Harold Hinkley threw a no–hitter on July 27, 1913, as Fremont defeated the Beatrice Milkskimmers 12–0.

In their final season, the 1913 Fremont Pathfinders had a final regular season record of 56–56, playing under manager H.A. Welch. Fremont finished in fourth place in the Nebraska State League final standings. Fremont found themselves with a $500 deficit after the season. The team tried a subscription drive and playing in a tournament to erase the debt, but both were unsuccessful. The franchise was sold to Norfolk, Nebraska, and the team moved to become the Norfolk Drummers in 1914.

Fremont, Nebraska has not hosted another minor league team.

In 2019, Fremont became home to the "Fremont Moo", a Collegiate summer baseball franchise, playing in the Expedition League.

== The ballpark ==
The Fremont Pathfinders played minor league home games at Association Lot. The ballpark was reported to have been located in an area south of East Main Street, Fremont, Nebraska.

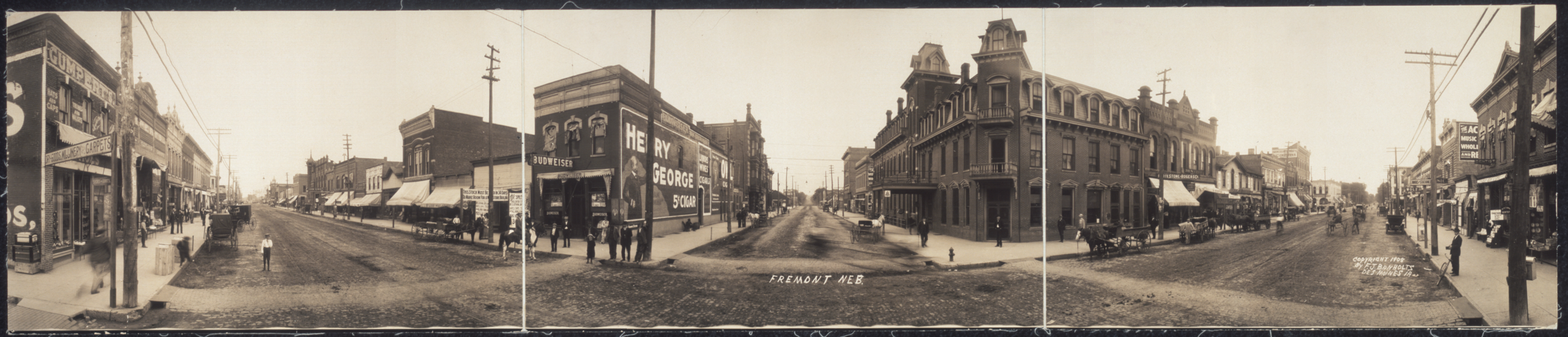
(1908) Fremont, Nebraska

== Timeline ==
| Year(s) | # Yrs. | Team | Level | League |
|---|---|---|---|---|
| 1892 | 1 | Fremont | Class B | Nebraska State League |
| 1910–1913 | 4 | Fremont Pathfinders | Class D | Nebraska State League |

== Year–by–year records ==
| Year | Record | Finish | Manager | Playoffs |
|---|---|---|---|---|
| 1892 | 11–18 | 5th | Norman L. Baker | League disbanded June 20 |
| 1910 | 63–42 | 1st | L.D. Bennett | League champions |
| 1911 | 69–43 | 2nd | L.D. Bennett | No playoffs held |
| 1912 | 66–45 | 1st (tie) | L.D. Bennett | Co-League Champions* |
| 1913 | 56–56 | 4th | H.A. Welch | No playoffs held |

== Notable alumni ==
- Jack Farrell (1912)
- Harry Smith (1910–1911)
- Fremont Pathfinders players
