= Spud Owen =

American athlete and coach (1905–1981)

Biographical details
- Born: March 10, 1905
- Died: February 8, 1981 (aged 75)
- Education: William Jewell College (1927)

Playing career

Football
- 1924–1926: William Jewell

Basketball
- 1924–1927: William Jewell

Baseball
- 1925–1928: William Jewell
- 1928: Beatrice Blues
- 1929: Norton Jayhawks
- 1930: McCook Generals
- 1931–1932: North Platte Buffalos
- Positions: Halfback (football); Guard (basketball)

Coaching career (HC unless noted)

Football
- ?–1946: Mendota Township HS (IL)
- 1947: Culver–Stockton (assistant)
- 1948–1951: Culver–Stockton
- 1952–1955: Eureka
- 1956–1958: Elmhurst

Basketball
- ?–1947: Mendota Township HS (IL)
- 1952–1956: Eureka

Baseball
- 1932: North Platte Buffalos

Administrative career (AD unless noted)
- 1952–1956: Eureka

Head coaching record
- Overall: 21–60–5 (college football); 28–53 (college basketball)

Harold Pryor "Spud" Owen (March 10, 1905 – February 8, 1981) was an American football, basketball, and baseball player and coach. He served as the head football coach at Culver–Stockton College in Canton, Missouri from 1948 to 1951, Eureka College in Eureka, Illinois from 1952 to 1955, and Elmhurst College in Elmhurst, Illinois from 1956 to 1958, compiling a career college football coaching record of 21–60–5. Owen was also the athletic director at Eureka from 1952 to 1956 and coached golf at Elmhurst.

A native of Orrick, Missouri, Owen attended William Jewell College in Liberty, Missouri, where he played football, basketball, and baseball. He was an all-Missouri Intercollegiate Athletic Association (MIAA) selection as a halfback in football and all-state at guard in basketball. Owen played Minor League Baseball for several teams in the Nebraska State League and was a player and manager for the North Platte Buffalos in 1932.

== Head coaching record ==
=== College football ===
Year	Team	Overall	Conference	Standing	Bowl/playoffs
Culver–Stockton Wildcats (Missouri College Athletic Union) (1948–1951)
1948	Culver–Stockton	4–5	3–1	2nd	
1949	Culver–Stockton	3–6	0–3	4th	
1950	Culver–Stockton	3–4–2	0–2–1	T–3rd	
1951	Culver–Stockton	3–4	2–2	3rd	
Culver–Stockton:		13–19–2	5–8–1		
Eureka Red Devils (Independent) (1952)
1952	Eureka	1–5–1			
Eureka Red Devils (Prairie College Conference) (1953–1955)
1953	Eureka	3–4			
1954	Eureka	1–5–1			
1955	Eureka	1–6–1	1–2	T–3rd	
Eureka:		6–20–3			
Elmhurst Bluejays (College Conference of Illinois) (1956–1958)
1956	Elmhurst	1–6	1–6	T–6th	
1957	Elmhurst	1–7	0–7	8th	
1958	Elmhurst	0–8	0–7	8th	
Elmhurst:		2–21	1–20		
Total:		21–60–5			
