= Red Cloud (baseball) =

Red Cloud "Indians"
- 1903–1910; (1903, 1910); Red Cloud, Nebraska

Minor league affiliations
- Class: Independent (1903); Class D (1910)
- League: Central Nebraska League (1903); Nebraska State League (1910)

Major league affiliations
- Team: None

Minor league titles
- League titles (0): None

Team data
- Name: Red Cloud (1903, 1910)
- Ballpark: City Park (1903, 1910)

The Red Cloud minor league baseball teams were based in Red Cloud, Nebraska in 1903 and 1910. Red Cloud played as members of the Central Nebraska League (1903) and Nebraska State League (1910). The Red Cloud moniker was cited locally as the "Indians".

== History ==
Red Cloud first fielded a minor league team as members of the short–lived 1903 Central Nebraska League, an Independent level league. The 1903 league standings through July 24, as reported in local newspapers, had the Red Cloud Indians in with fourth place with an 8–16 record, 10.0 games behind the first place Holdrege Silver Ashes on that date.

The five members of the 1903 Central Nebraska League were the teams based in Giltner, Holdrege, McCook, Minden joining Red Cloud, Nebraska. The other league teams were without known monikers, common in the era.

While the 1903 league records and statistics are unknown, the player rosters are known. The Central Nebraska League permanently folded after the 1903 season.

In 1910, minor league baseball returned to Red Cloud. The Red Cloud "Indians" team became charter members of the reformed Class D level Nebraska State League. The other teams joining Red Cloud in the eight–team league were the Columbus Discoverers, Grand Island Collegians, Fremont Pathfinders, Hastings Brickmakers, Kearney Kapitalists, Seward Statesmen and the Superior Brickmakers. The 1910 Nebraska State League set a salary limit of $900.00 and a roster limit of 12 players.

The Red Cloud franchise was referred to as the "Indians" in both the Fremont and Kearney newspapers.

On the opening day in Red Cloud, mayor Dahlman of Omaha, Nebraska threw out the first pitch. An automobile parade and the Red Cloud High School band provided the pregame festivities. Clarence Mitchell pitched Red Cloud to a 5–0 victory in the opener.

In the 1910 season, their final season of play, Red Cloud finished the season in seventh place. With an overall record of 47–62, Red Cloud played under manager Ben F. Grant. The Fremont Pathfinders finished first in the standings with a 63–42 record, finishing 4.5 games ahead of the second place Columbus Discoverers and 17.5 games ahead of Red Cloud. Red Cloud drew 10,126 total fans for the season. Fred Jarrott of Red Cloud led the Nebraska State League in batting average and hits, hitting .326 with 126 total hits.

Sunday laws affected the league teams. In July 1910, Justice Gladwish had the Red Cloud and Seward teams arrested for playing a game on Sunday. The two teams had played the game in Staplehurst, Nebraska a town which did not enforce the Sunday baseball laws. However, the Judge decided to prosecute the case on his own.

The taverns of Red Cloud pledged close to $500.00 to support the 1910 team as part of a campaign to keep the city of Red Cloud "wet". The City of Red Cloud scheduled a vote on the alcohol issue on the ballot in the spring of 1910. Red Cloud voters passed the issue, and the town became dry in the spring of 1910. The taverns closed as a result of the election and the Red Cloud franchise struggled financially during the season.

In the 1911 Nebraska State League, the Red Cloud franchise did not return to the league. The Red Cloud franchise was replaced by the York Prohibitionists in league play. Red Cloud has not hosted another minor league team.

== The ballpark ==
The Red Cloud teams hosted home minor league home games at the City Park in Red Cloud. Founded in 1871, Red Cloud City Park is still in use as a public park, located at Cedar Street & 2nd Avenue in Red Cloud, Nebraska.

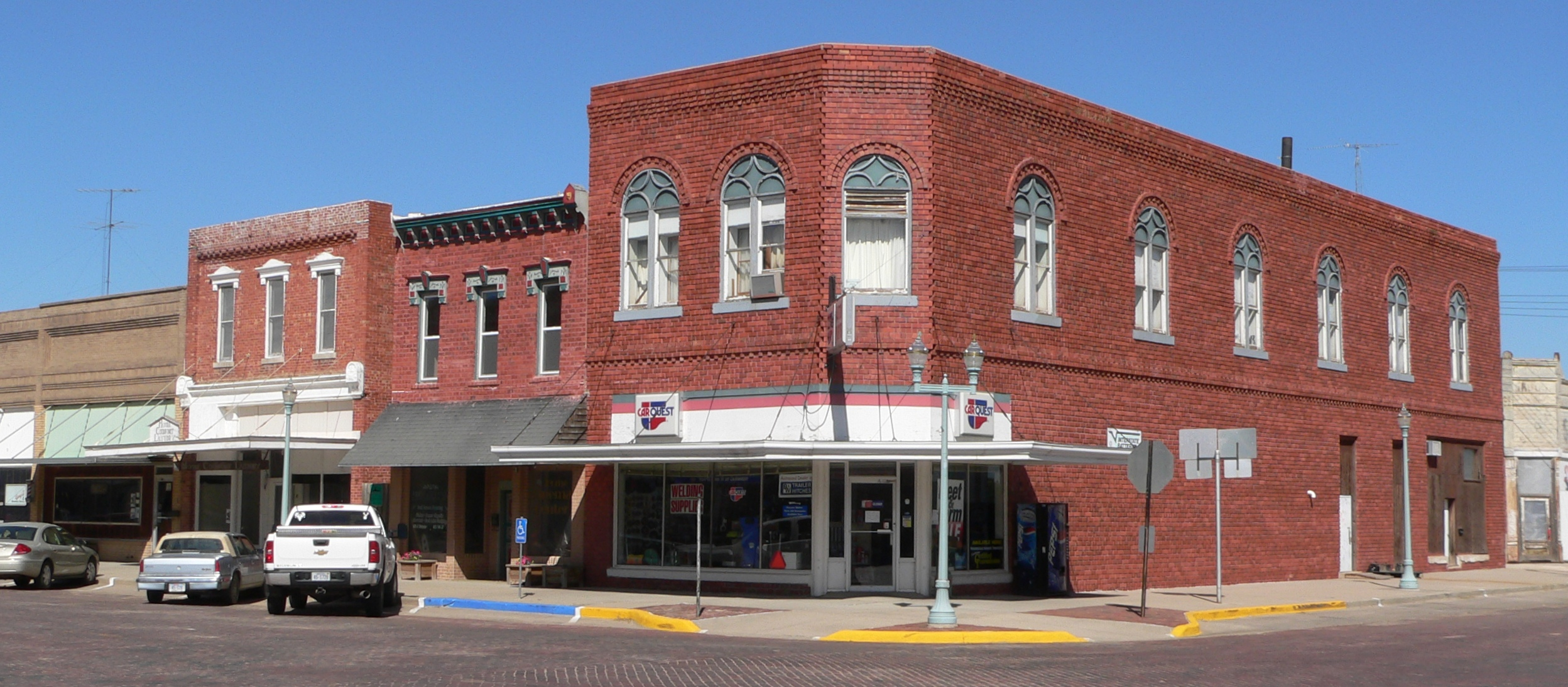
(2010) 4th Ave and Webster NE. National Register of Historic Places. Red Cloud, Nebraska

== Timeline ==
Year(s)	# Yrs.	Team	Level	League	Ballpark
1903	1	Red Cloud	Independent	Central Nebraska League	Red Cloud City Park
1910	1	Red Cloud	Class D	Nebraska State League	Red Cloud City Park

== Year-by-year records ==
Year	Record	Finish	Manager	Playoffs/Notes
1903	8–16	4th	NA	Standings on July 24
1910	47–62	7th	Ben F. Grant	No playoffs held

== Notable alumni ==
- Clarence Mitchell (1910)
