= Oren Beltzer =

- Born: March 20, 1888; Stratton, Nebraska
- Died: September 22, 1959 (aged 71); Chicago

Oren Allen Beltzer (March 20, 1888 – September 22, 1959) was a prominent Nebraskan sports figure. He was nicknamed "Buck" and also went by "O. A." His first name has also been listed as "Owen."

Beltzer was born in Stratton, Nebraska. He attended Arapahoe High School before going to the University of Nebraska, where he played baseball and football, captaining both teams in 1909. Following his time at college, he formed a traveling baseball team called the Oxford Indians. In 1910, he joined the professional Grand Island Collegians of the Nebraska State League, with whom he batted .205 in 105 games at the team's player-manager. His contract was purchased by the Philadelphia Athletics at the end of the season, though he never played for the club. He joined a barnstorming team, the Nebraska Indians, in 1911, eventually purchasing the club. In 1922, he returned to the professional ranks, managing the Lincoln Links to a second-place finish in the Nebraska State League. In 1923, he returned as the Links skipper, leading them to a 71-64 first-place finish. Major leaguers Charlie Gibson, Pid Purdy and Art Stokes played for him.

He later became president of Grand Island Trust Company in Grand Island, Nebraska. Buck Beltzer Stadium, former home of the Nebraska Cornhuskers baseball team, was named after him.

He died in Chicago.
