= Doc Bennett =

Elmer S. "Doc" Bennett (February 1, 1891 in Ruyle, Illinois, U.S. – March 31, 1974 in Hollywood, California, U.S.) was an American minor league baseball pitcher and player, who later became a very successful minor league manager, leading five teams to league championships in 13 years of managing. He spent much of his career as a player-manager.

He later spent time as a major league scout.

== Playing career ==
His playing career spanned from 1920 to 1932, although he played in only seven of those seasons - he did not play in 1922, 1923, 1925, 1926, 1927 or 1931. He played in 160 games in his career, hitting around .253. In those years, he met and worked with Red Ruffing, helping him transition into a pitcher. He also helped Ruffing sign his first professional contract.

== Managing career ==
Bennett's first foray into managing was in 1923, with the Cairo Egyptians of the KITTY League. He replaced Jack Herbert and was one of two managers for the Egyptians that season.

He would not manage again until 1928, with the McCook Generals of the Nebraska State League. He led them to league championships three years in a row, from 1928 to 1930, and a second-place finish in 1931. In 1928, the team seized first place after ten games, retaining that position for the rest of the year. They finished with a five-game lead over the second place Lincoln Links. Due to his and the team's success that year, McCook led the league in attendance, and Bennett was named the All-Star team manager, along with three of his players.

In 1929, the team finished 6.5 games over the second place Fairbury Jeffersons. Although many teams were negatively affected by the 1929 Stock Market Crash in 1930, the Generals ended up having their best season, finishing 17 games over the Fairbury Jeffersons. They posted a record of 85–34.

Over the course of his four-year tenure as manager of the Generals, he played in 77 of his team's games, or about 19 a year.

In 1932, he led the Waterloo Hawks of the Mississippi Valley League to a losing record. He managed the Lincoln Links of the Nebraska State League for part of 1933 season before being replaced by Jack Hruska. After being fired by the Links, he served as a league umpire.

He did not manage from 1934 to 1936.

In 1937, he took over as manager of the Norfolk Elks, a New York Yankees affiliate in the Nebraska State League (which became the Western League in 1939). Although he led the Elks to a losing record in 1937, he led them to a league championship in 1938 and a first-place finish in 1939, however the team lost in the first round of the playoffs that season.

The Elks became the Norfolk Yankees in 1940. Bennett led them to a first-place finish, though the team lost in the first round of the playoffs.

From 1941 to 1942, Bennett managed the Joplin Miners of the Western Association, another Yankees affiliate. He led them to a first-place finish and a league championship in 1941, however they finished with a losing record and a fifth-place finish in 1942. Thus concluded his managerial career.

== Scouting career ==
Bennett scouted for the Boston Red Sox from 1943 to 1949 and the Chicago White Sox from 1950 to 1969.
