= Jerry Akers =

American baseball player (1887–1979)

- Pitcher
- Born: November 1, 1887; Shelbyville, Indiana, U.S.
- Died: May 15, 1979 (aged 91); Bay Pines, Florida, U.S.
- Batted: Right Threw: Right

MLB debut
- May 4, 1912, for the Washington Senators

Last MLB appearance
- May 25, 1912, for the Washington Senators

MLB statistics
- Win–loss record: 1–1
- Earned run average: 4.87
- Strikeouts: 11
- Stats at Baseball Reference

Teams
- Washington Senators (1912)

Albert Earl "Jerry" Akers (November 1, 1887 – May 15, 1979) was an American professional baseball player whose career spanned seven seasons, including a part of one in Major League Baseball with the Washington Senators (1912). Akers was a pitcher. During his time in the majors, Akers compiled a record of 1–1 with a 4.87 earned run average (ERA) and 11 strikeouts in five games, one start. Akers also played in the minor leagues with the Class-D Jacksonville Jacks/Lunatics/Braves (1906–1907, 1909), the Class-D Kearney Kapitalists (1910), the Class-B Dubuque Dubs (1910), the Class-D Canton Highlanders (1912), the Double-A Montreal Royals (1912), the Double-A Rochester Hustlers (1912) and the Class-B Peoria Distillers (1914). Although statistics for Akers in the minor leagues are incomplete, what is recorded is a record of 70–73 in 166 games. Akers batted and threw right-handed.

== Professional career ==
Akers started his professional baseball in 1906 with the Class-D Jacksonville Jacks, who represented Jacksonville, Illinois. The Jacks were a member of the Kentucky–Illinois–Tennessee League that season. That season, Akers compiled a record of 10–9 in 20 games, 19 starts. In 1907, the Jacksonville team changed their name to the "Lunatics" and joined the Iowa League of Professional Baseball Clubs. With Jacksonville that season, Akers went 15–15 in an unknown number of games. After an absence from the professional circuit in 1908, Akers re-joined the Jacksonville club, now renamed the "Braves". Jacksonville also switched leagues again, joining the Central Association. In 31 games that season, Akers went 10–12.

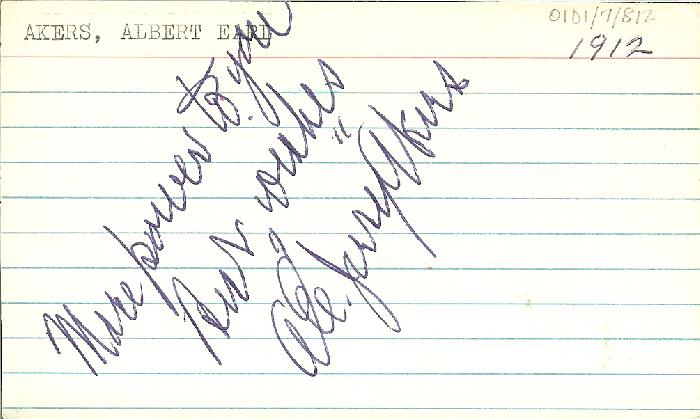
Akers' autograph on a note card, dated 1912.

During the 1910 season, Akers played for two teams. First, with the Class-D Kearney Kapitalists of the Nebraska State League. His pitching statistics were not kept during his time with the Kearney team. The second team Akers played for in 1910 was the Class-B Dubuque Dubs of the Illinois–Indiana–Iowa League. With the Dubuque club, Akers went 5–4 in 10 games. In 1911, Akers continued playing for Dubuque, who were renamed the "Hustlers". In 39 games, Akers went 19–12. His 19 wins tied him for seventh overall in the Illinois–Indiana–Iowa League.

In the 1911 Rule 5 draft, Akers was selected by the Washington Senators. Akers started the season at the Class-D level with the Canton Highlanders, who represented Canton, Illinois. During his stint with the Highlanders, Akers went 5–4 in 15 games. Akers was then called up to the Senators and Akers made his debut in Major League Baseball on May 4, 1912. With the Senators that season, Akers went 1–1 with a 4.87 earned run average and 11 strikeouts in five games, one start. He last appearance in the majors was on May 25, 1912. Also on that day, Akers was traded to the Double-A Montreal Royals along with pitcher Charlie Becker and outfielder Bill Cunningham in exchange for first baseman Chick Gandil.

Akers went on to pitch for the Double-A Montreal Royals and the Double-A Rochester Hustlers in 1912. Combined between both International League (IL) teams, he went 6–17 in 20 games. Along pitchers Ed Lafitte and Marty McHale, Akers was third in the IL in losses. Akers did not pitch in professional baseball in 1913, but did return for the 1914 season, his last in his professional playing career. He joined the Class-D Peoria Distillers that season, who represented Peoria, Illinois. Akers pitched 21 games that season.

== Later life ==
Akers served in World War I. After his retirement from professional baseball, Akers resided in Town 'n' Country, Florida, a suburb of Tampa. He was married to Hazel Schuneman from November 12, 1931, until her death on March 29, 1958. Akers died on May 15, 1979, in Bay Pines, Florida. He was buried at Garden Of Memories Cemetery in Tampa.
