= Kearney Memorial Field =

Baseball ballpark located in Kearney, Nebraska

Coordinates: 40°42′33″N 99°05′33″W

Memorial Field
- Interactive map of Memorial Field
- Address: 3311 8th Avenue; Kearney NE 68845
- Location: Kearney, Nebraska
- Owner: City of Kearney, Nebraska
- Operator: City of Kearney, Nebraska
- Capacity: 2,000
- Surface: Turf (Infield) Grass (Outfield)
- Field size: Left Field: 355 ft (108.2 m); Center Field: 395 ft (120.4 m); Right Field: 325 ft (99.1 m)

Construction
- Groundbreaking: 1940
- Opened: 1946

Tenants
- Kearney Irishmen (1946-1954,1960-1962); Kearney Yankees (1956-1959); Nebraska–Kearney Lopers Baseball (??-2018); Kearney Legion Baseball (??-Present)

Kearney Memorial Field is a baseball ballpark located in Kearney, Nebraska. It was the home stadium of the University of Nebraska at Kearney baseball team before it dropped the sport in 2018, and once served as the home field for the Kearney Yankees, a New York Yankees Class "D" minor league affiliate in the Nebraska League. and The Kearney Irishmen

The Stadium replaced the ballpark at the fairgrounds.

Built just after World War II, it currently seats over 2,000 people.

The Ball Park is also home to the Joba Chamberlain Indoor Hitting Center, built in 2008 and named after MLB Baseball Player, Joba Chamberlain. The facility is utilized by the University of Nebraska Kearney Baseball and Softball Teams.
