= Lyman Lamb =

American baseball player (1895-1955)

- Third baseman / Outfielder
- Born: March 17, 1895; Lincoln, Nebraska, U.S.
- Died: October 5, 1955 (aged 60); Fayetteville, Arkansas, U.S.
- Batted: Right Threw: Right

MLB debut
- September 14, 1920, for the St. Louis Browns

Last MLB appearance
- September 24, 1921, for the St. Louis Browns

MLB statistics
- Batting average: .272
- Home runs: 1
- Runs batted in: 21
- Stats at Baseball Reference

Teams
- St. Louis Browns (1920–1921)

Lyman Raymond Lamb (March 17, 1895 – October 5, 1955) was an American professional baseball outfielder and third baseman. While playing in the minor leagues in 1924, he hit 100 doubles to set the organized baseball single-season record.

== Baseball career ==
Lamb was born in Lincoln, Nebraska, in 1895. He was 5 ft 7 in (1.70 m) tall and weighed 150 lb. Lamb started his professional baseball career in 1915 with the Fairbury Shaners and played for the Joplin Miners of the Western League from 1917 to 1920.

In September 1920, Lamb made his Major League Baseball debut with the American League's St. Louis Browns. He played nine MLB games that season and had a batting average of .375. In 1921, he played in 45 games for the Browns and batted .254. The American Association's Louisville Colonels purchased Lamb's contract in January 1922, and he never played in the majors again.

Lamb spent most of the 1922 to 1925 seasons with the Western League's Tulsa Oilers. In 1922, he led the league with 68 doubles and helped the Oilers win the pennant. In 1923, he hit 71 doubles to lead the league again. In 1924, Lamb played 168 games, batted .373, and led the league with 261 hits and 100 doubles. The 100 doubles were an organized baseball single-season record.

From 1926 to 1928, Lamb played for the Wichita Falls Spudders of the Texas League. He then bounced around different minor league teams before retiring in 1931.

During his professional baseball career, Lamb played 2,007 games and had 7,703 at bats, 2,349 hits, 593 doubles, 77 triples, and 123 home runs. He was mostly a third baseman in the majors and mostly an outfielder in the minors.

Lamb died in Fayetteville, Arkansas, in 1955.
