= Buck Beltzer Stadium =

Baseball park in Lincoln, Nebraska

Coordinates: 40.8217°N 96.7038°W

- "The Buck"
- Interactive map of Buck Beltzer Stadium
- Former names: The Nebraska Diamond
- Location: Lincoln, Nebraska
- Owner: University of Nebraska
- Capacity: No permanent seating (before 1979); 1,000 (1979–1980); 1,500 (1981–2001)
- Type: Stadium
- Surface: Infield: artificial turf Outfield: grass
- Record attendance: 5,484 (Jun. 2, 2001)
- Field size: Left field: 330 ft (100 m); Left-center: 375 ft (114 m); Center field: 400 ft (120 m); Right-center: 375 ft (114 m); Right field: 330 ft (100 m)

Construction
- Opened: mid-1940s
- Renovated: 1989, 1997
- Expanded: 1979, 1981
- Closed: June 2, 2001

Tenants
- Nebraska Cornhuskers baseball (mid 1940s–2001)

Buck Beltzer Stadium (originally The Nebraska Diamond or The Husker Diamond) was a college baseball stadium on the campus of the University of Nebraska–Lincoln in Lincoln, Nebraska. It primarily served as the home venue for the Nebraska Cornhuskers baseball team from the mid-1940s until 2001, when the university constructed Hawks Field at Haymarket Park.

== History ==
The stadium was located northeast of Memorial Stadium adjacent to Interstate 180, and was known as The Nebraska Diamond when opened in the mid-1940s. The field was initially little more than a dirt infield and a handful of temporary wooden bleachers. The ballpark had an artificial turf infield installed in 1977 and was renamed in 1979 in honor of Oren "Buck" Beltzer, a standout football and baseball player at Nebraska who was captain of both teams in 1909, after a donation from the Beltzer family allowed for the installation of covered dugouts, a press box, and 1,000 permanent aluminum seats (expanded to 1,500 shortly after). Donations from the Californians for Nebraska alumni association allowed for installation of a scoreboard in 1981 and lights in 1989.

By the time of its closing, Buck Beltzer Stadium was considered out-of-date and lacked many features common among major Division I college baseball venues. The artificial turf infield had fallen out of favor despite several replacements since its initial installation in 1977, and the turf-to-grass transition from infield to outfield was unique among collegiate venues. The stadium could not have a warning track or a permanent fence because Nebraska's football team used the outfield to practice for games to be played on grass. These practices meant the outfield was often covered in divots, making ground balls difficult for outfielders to properly field (termed "the bounce of the Buck" or "the Buck bounce"). Despite its shortcomings, the unique features and intimate environment at Buck Beltzer Stadium made it generally well-liked by Nebraska's players and supporters, especially as the program improved under Dave Van Horn – the team elected to finish the 2001 season at the Buck despite the newly constructed Hawks Field being available to host late-season games.

Buck Beltzer Stadium hosted five NCAA Division I tournament games, all in 2001 – these were the five largest crowds in the ballpark's history as extra bleachers were installed to increase capacity to over 5,000. Nebraska's final game at the stadium was a 9–6 win over Rice to send the program to its first College World Series. NU's record at the venue after its 1979 dedication was 527–137.

== Closure ==
When the team moved to its new facility in 2002, descendants of Beltzer unsuccessfully campaigned the university and City of Lincoln to name the field after Buck. Buck Beltzer Stadium was converted into football practice fields as part of the Hawks Championship Center before being demolished in its entirety in 2020 to make room for the Osborne Legacy Complex.
