= Woody Huyke =

Puerto Rican baseball player and coach (born 1937)

Elwood B. Huyke (born September 28, 1937) is a Puerto Rican professional baseball player, coach, and manager.

Huyke's grandfather immigrated from the Netherlands to Puerto Rico. Huyke signed with the San Francisco Giants after graduating from school at the age of 22. He played for the Hastings Giants, a San Francisco Giants minor league affiliate, in 1959. He played for the Monterrey Sultanes of the Mexican League in 1960. Huyke also played for the Puerto Rico national baseball team in the 1960 Caribbean Series. Huyke played in the Kansas City / Oakland Athletics system from 1961 through 1968, and for the Pittsburgh Pirates system from 1969 until he retired after the 1973 season. He was featured in an article in the June 14, 1971, issue of Sports Illustrated magazine.

In 1974, Huyke began his managerial career. He managed in the Pirates' organization from 1974 through 2004. He voluntarily stepped down as manager after the 2004 season, remaining with the Gulf Coast League Pirates as a coach. One of Woody's early successes, in 1989, was identifying Tim Wakefield's potential as a knuckleball pitcher (at the time, Wakefield was a light-hitting first baseman) and convincing the Pittsburgh Pirates organization not to release him.

In 2010, Huyke won the Mike Coolbaugh Award for his mentoring of minor league players.
