= Medveditsa, Volgograd Oblast =

Medveditsa Медведица
- Selo
- Location within Volgograd Oblast Location within Russia
- Coordinates: 51°04′N 44°49′E
- Country: Russia
- Region: Volgograd Oblast
- District: Zhirnovsky District
- Time zone: UTC+4:00

Medveditsa (Russian: Медве́дица) (formerly Frank) is a rural locality (a selo) and the administrative center of Medveditskoye Rural Settlement, Zhirnovsky District, Volgograd Oblast, Russia. The population was 2,404 as of 2010. There are 16 streets.

The locality was founded by Volga Germans as the colony of Frank on 16 May 1767.

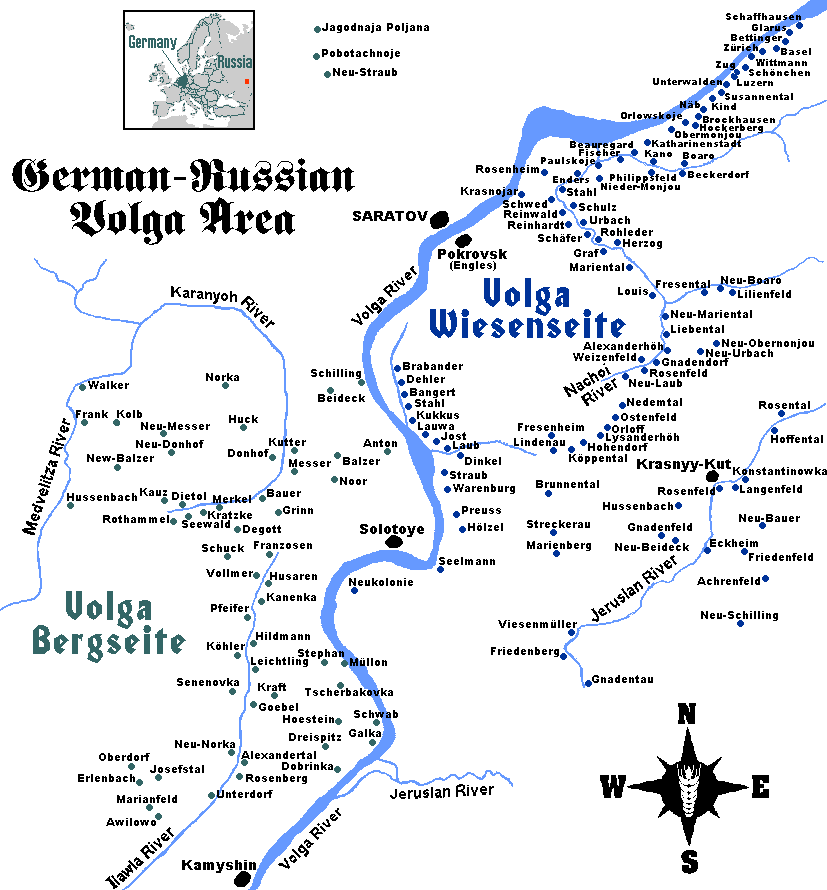
Volga German settlements, including Frank

== Geography ==
Medveditsa is located in the steppe of the Volga Upland, on the left bank of the Medveditsa River, 13 km north of Zhirnovsk (the district's administrative centre) by road. Alexandrovka is the nearest rural locality.

== Notable persons ==
- Jake Gettman, American professional baseball player (Washington Senators)
