= Art Mazmanian =

American baseball coach and manager (1927–2019)

- Infielder
- Born: May 1, 1927; Detroit, Michigan, U.S.
- Died: March 22, 2019 (aged 91); San Dimas, California, U.S.
- Batted: Right Threw: Right
- Stats at Baseball Reference

Arthur S. Mazmanian (May 1, 1927 – March 22, 2019) was an American baseball coach and manager. He was the longtime baseball coach at Dorsey High School of Los Angeles, his alma mater, then spent 31 seasons (1968–98) as head coach of baseball at Mount San Antonio College of Walnut, California, where his teams won 709 games and had only two losing campaigns. He also was a second baseman, scout, instructor, and manager in professional baseball from 1949 through 1987. He died at the age of 91 on March 22, 2019.

== Biography ==
Mazmanian was born in Detroit, Michigan, to parents who were born in Armenia. After Dorsey High School, he graduated from the University of Southern California, where he was an All-American and the second baseman on the Trojans' 1948 national championship team. He threw and batted right-handed and was listed as 5 feet 10 inches (1.78 m) tall and 170 pounds (77 kg).

Mazmanian's six-year playing career (1949–54) was largely spent in the New York Yankees' farm system, including 2½ seasons at the Triple-A level with the Kansas City Blues of the American Association. In 1955, he became a coach in the St. Louis Cardinals' organization, then launched his managing career the following season with the Grand Island Athletics, Class D Nebraska State League affiliate of the Kansas City Athletics of the American League. During the 1960s he scouted for the Athletics and the Cleveland Indians. He resumed his managerial career in 1971 and achieved sustained success later in the decade when he rejoined the Yankees as skipper of their Short Season Class-A New York–Penn League affiliate, the Oneonta Yankees. He managed the O-Yankees to five consecutive division championships (1977–81) and four league playoff championships (1977; 1979–81). He then managed in the New York–Penn League for the Baltimore Orioles for three seasons and recorded his last season in organized baseball with a "co-op" team in the same circuit in 1987.

Apart from a temporary assignment with the Visalia Oaks of the California League in 1960, all of Mazmanian's years as a professional baseball manager were spent in "short season" or rookie-level leagues. He compiled a managing record of 663–487 (.576). In 1984, he took a leave of absence from the Orioles to serve as an assistant coach for the United States Olympic Baseball Team.
