= York Dukes =

- 1911–1931; (1911–1915, 1928–1931); York, Nebraska

Minor league affiliations
- Class: Class D (1911–1915, 1928–1931)
- League: Nebraska State League (1911–1915, 1928–1931)

Major league affiliations
- Team: None

Minor league titles
- League titles (0): None

Team data
- Name: York Prohibitionists (1911–1915); York Dukes (1928–1931)
- Ballpark: Parks Park (1911–1915); Leavitt Stadium (1928–1931)

The York Dukes were a minor league baseball team based in York, Nebraska. Between 1911 and 1931, York teams played exclusively as members of the Class D level Nebraska State League. The York Prohibitionists preceded the Dukes, playing in the Nebraska State League from 1911 to 1915. The Prohibitionists played home Nebraska State League games at Parks Park, and the Dukes hosted home games at Leavitt Stadium.

Baseball Hall of Fame member Dazzy Vance pitched for the 1912 York Prohibitionists.

== History ==
The team was given the York Dukes moniker after a naming contest held by the local paper, the York Daily News. Previously, the York Prohibitionists had played in the Nebraska State League from 1911 to 1915.

York had been awarded the Red Cloud, Nebraska franchise in 1911, after Red Cloud had one year of Nebraska State League play. The York team started without any players from the Red Cloud franchise and without a nickname. York was then a dry town and did not allow Sunday baseball to be played. After the team played their first away game against the Fremont Pathfinders from Fremont, Nebraska, a Fremont sportswriter gave them the nickname York Prohibitionists and the name stuck.

In 1912, with Dazzy Vance on the roster, the Prohibistions drew 1,700 fans to Parks Park on opening day.

At the beginning of the 1915 season, the Kearney Buffaloes and Columbus Pawnees franchises both folded, leaving the league reduced to six teams. Then at the end of June, 1915, the Grand Island Champions withdrew from the league and the Nebraska State League disbanded on June 29, 1915, with York in 3rd place.

In 1928, when the franchise returned to the reformed Nebraska State League, the York Dukes, played at Leavitt Stadium and drew 9,434 fans for the season. They had an average daily attendance of 205 fans on weekdays and 637 fans on Sundays, with the Sunday baseball ban having been lifted. The name "Dukes" was selected in a naming contest by the local newspaper and Mr. Ezra McCormick of 128 Blackburn won the prize of two free tickets to the opening game for submitting the Dukes name. Other entries included Beavers, Panthers, Tommies, Plezalls and HillToppers.

After the 1931 season, the York franchise relocated to become the Beatrice Blues in Beatrice, Nebraska.

York has not hosted another minor league team.

== The ballparks ==
The York Dukes' home field was noted to be Leavitt Stadium, located within East Hill Park. The Prohibitionists had reportedly played home games at Parks Park, which was located near downtown York.

Leavitt Stadium is still in use. Today, the park the is home to the York College Panthers baseball team. Levitt Stadium hosted the 2001 American Legion Nebraska State Baseball Tournament and is also home for local Legion Teams. The ballpark is located at 921 East 6th street, between East 6th and East 8th Street in York, Nebraska.

== Timeline ==
Year(s)	# Yrs.	Team	Level	League
1911–1915	5	York York Prohibitionists	Class D	Nebraska State League
1928–1931	4	York Dukes	Class D	Nebraska State League

== Year–by–year records ==
Year	Record	Finish	Manager	Playoffs
1911	54–60	5th	George Harms / Lefty Davis	No playoffs held
1912	45–66	7th	Lefty Davis	No playoffs held
1913	57–55	3rd	Frank Gardner	No playoffs held
1914	60–52	4th	Jim Pierce	No playoffs held
1915	25–31	3rd	Jim Pierce	No playoffs held
1928	50–62	5th	Art Rasmussen	No playoffs held
1929	61–53	4th	Art Rasmussen	No playoffs held
1930	60–59	4th	Art Rasmussen	No playoffs held
1931	42–67	6th	Vern "Pop" Gleason / Bob Browne	No playoffs held

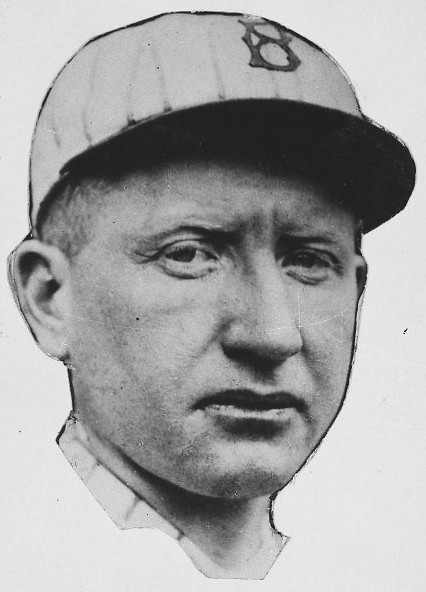
Dazzy Vance, 1922

== Notable alumni ==
- Dazzy Vance (1912) Inducted Baseball Hall of Fame, 1955
- Lefty Davis (Player/MGR, 1911–1912)
- Buzz Murphy (1914)
- Jack Richardson (1913)
- Bennie Warren (1931)
- Dutch Wetzel (1915)
