= Red Smyth =

American baseball player (1893–1958)

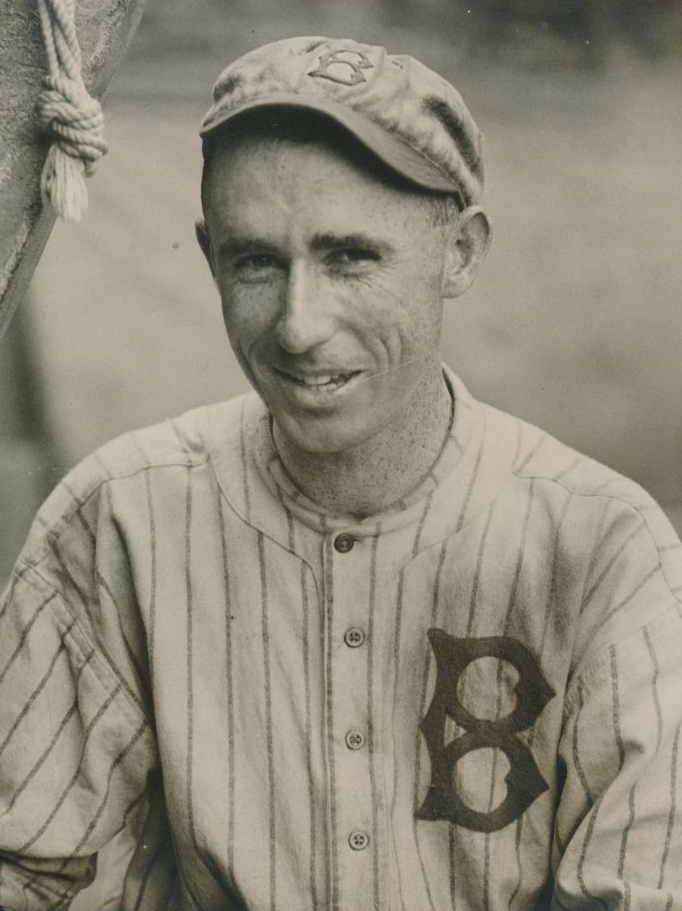
- Outfielder
- Born: January 30, 1893; Holly Springs, Mississippi, U.S.
- Died: April 14, 1958 (aged 65); Inglewood, California, U.S.
- Batted: Left Threw: Right

MLB debut
- August 11, 1915, for the Brooklyn Robins

Last MLB appearance
- June 18, 1918, for the St. Louis Cardinals

MLB statistics
- Batting average: .191
- Home runs: 0
- Runs batted in: 12
- Stats at Baseball Reference

Teams
- Brooklyn Robins (1915–1917); St. Louis Cardinals (1917–1918)

James Daniel "Red" Smyth (January 30, 1893 – April 14, 1958) was an American outfielder in Major League Baseball from 1915 to 1918 with the Brooklyn Robins and St. Louis Cardinals.
