= North Platte Indians =

- 1956–1959; (1928–1932, 1956–1959); North Platte, Nebraska

Minor league affiliations
- Class: Class D (1928–1932), (1956–1959)
- League: Nebraska State League (1928–1932), (1956–1959)

Major league affiliations
- Team: Cleveland Indians (1956–1959)

Minor league titles
- League titles (1): 1958
- Conference titles (1): 1931
- Wild card berths (0): None

Team data
- Name: North Platte Buffalos (1928–1932); North Platte Indians (1956–1958)
- Ballpark: Jeffers Field (1928–1932); Bill Wood Field (1956–1959)

The North Platte Indians were a minor league baseball team based in North Platte, Nebraska. The Indians played as members of the Class D level Nebraska State League from 1956 to 1959, winning the 1958 league championship. The North Platte Indians were a minor league affiliate of the Cleveland Indians.

The Indians were preceded in minor league play by the North Platte Buffalos who played from 1928 to 1932, also playing as members of the Class D level Nebraska State League.

The North Platte Buffalos hosted minor league home games at Jeffers Field within Union Pacific Park. The ballpark was later destroyed by fire. When minor league play resumed, the North Platte Indians played home games at Bill Wood Field within Cody Park.

== History ==
Based in North Platte, Nebraska, the North Platte Indians were an affiliate of the Cleveland Indians, playing as members of the Nebraska State League. Previously, the North Platte Buffalos played as members of the Nebraska State League from 1928 to 1932. The North Platte Indians finished 41–22 in 1958 and captured the 1958 Nebraska State League Championship, playing under manager Mark Wylie.

On July 29, 1928, North Platte pitcher Joe Smith threw a no–hitter in a 7–inning game against the Beatrice Blues. North Platte won the game 3–0.

The Nebraska State League folded permanently after the 1959 season. The 1959 league member franchises folded as well, the Hastings Giants, Holdrege White Sox, Grand Island Athletics, Kearney Yankees, McCook Braves and North Platte Indians all folded.

== The ballparks ==
The Union Pacific Park hosted the North Platte Buffalos from 1928 to 1932 for minor league home games. The ballpark within the park was called Jeffers Field. The ballpark was destroyed by fire in 1955. Jeffers Field was located 7th and Jeffers in North Platte, Nebraska.

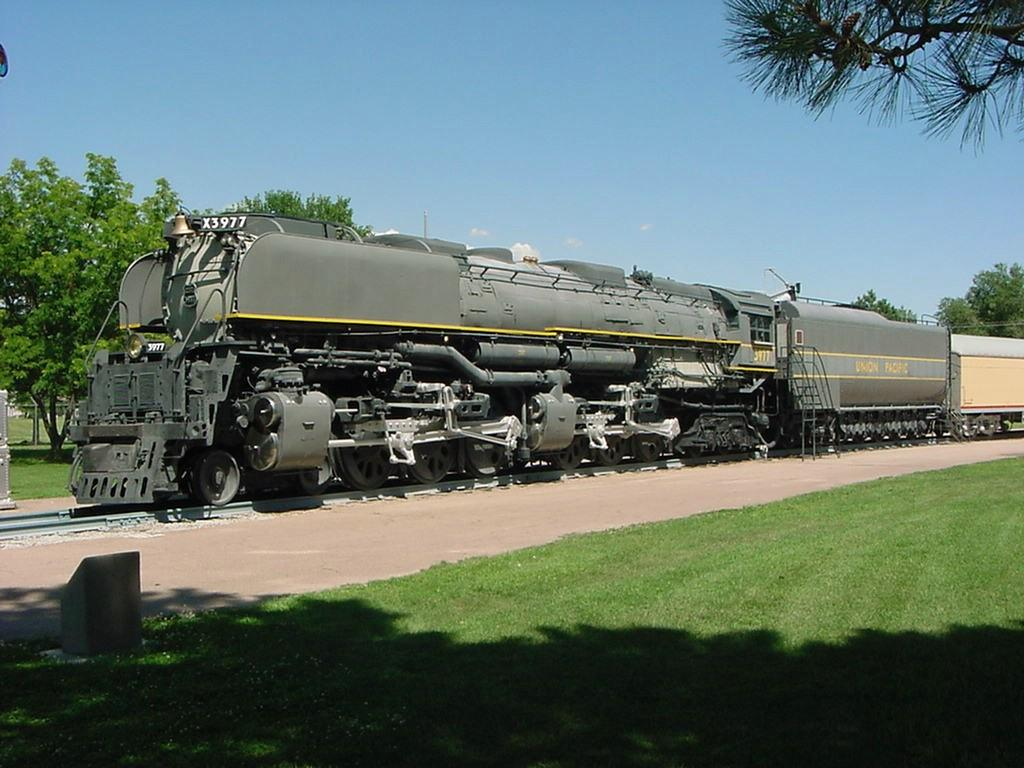
(2007) Union Pacific Challenger. Cody Park. North Platte, Nebraska.

After the fire destroyed Jeffers Field, Bill Wood Field was constructed in 1956, within Cody Park. Bill Wood Field hosted the North Platte Indians for minor league home games beginning in 1956. The ballfield is still in use today, located within Cody Park near the park's National Guard building. Today, Bill Wood Field is home to North Platte American Legion baseball and the North Platte 80s, a 2024 Pecos League expansion team. The park is located at 18th & Jeffers in North Platte, Nebraska.

== Timeline ==
Year(s)	# Yrs.	Team	Level	League	Ballpark	Affiliate
1928–1932	5	North Platte Buffalos	Class D	Nebraska State League	Jeffers Field	None
1956–1958	4	North Platte Indians	Class D	Nebraska State League	Bill Wood Field	Cleveland Indians

== Year–by–year records ==
Year	Record	Finish	Manager	Playoffs
1956	24–39	7th	Spence Harris	No playoffs held
1957	11–45	8th	Rudy York	No playoffs held
1958	41–22	1st	Mark Wylie	League champions
1959	22–40	6th	Mark Wylie	No playoffs held

== Notable alumni ==
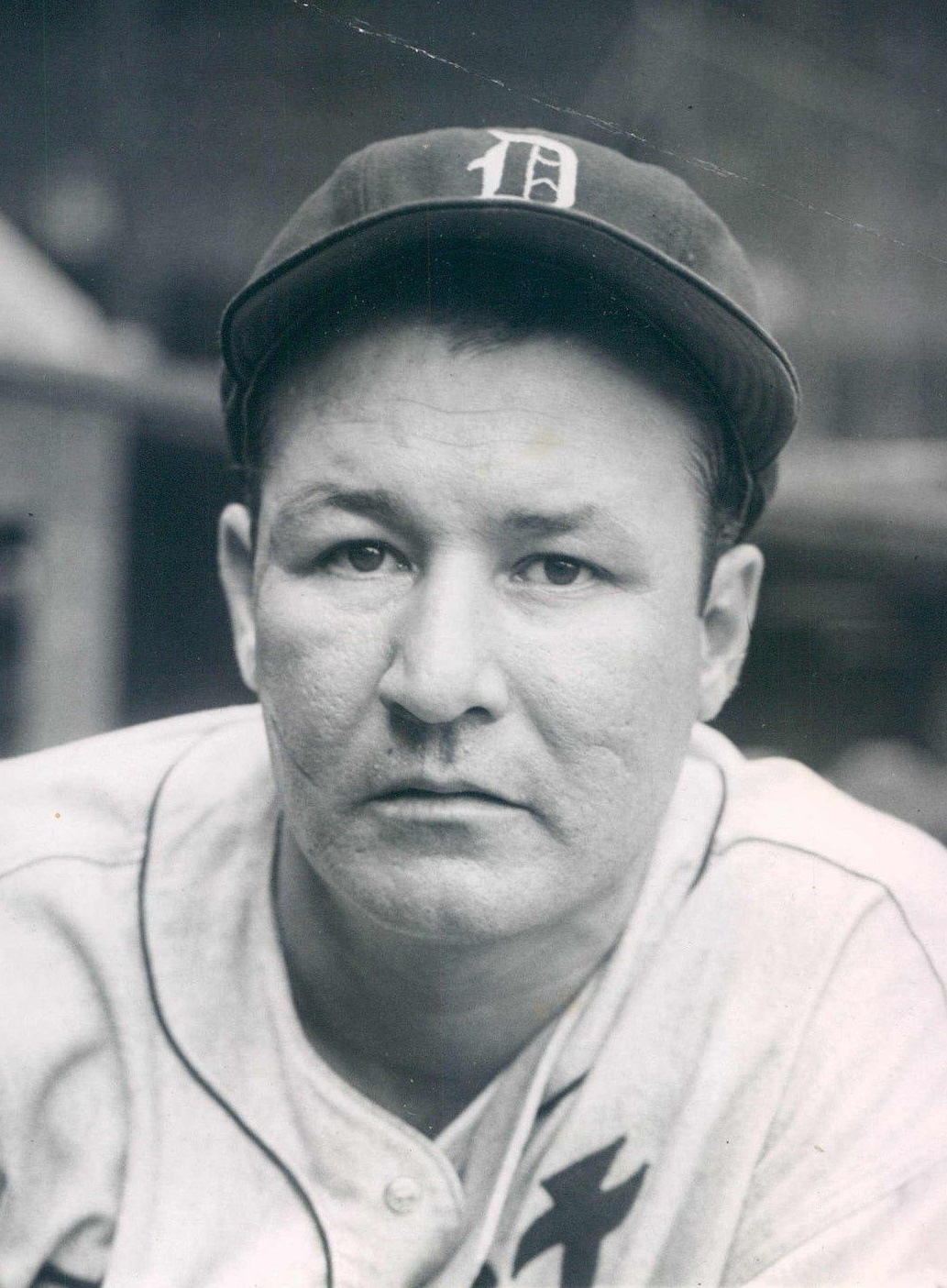
Rudy York 1945

- Bob Allen (1956)
- Doc Edwards (1958)
- Spence Harris (MGR, 1956) Minor league career records runs (2,287), doubles (743), hits (3,617)
- Ramon Lopez (1958)
- Jim Perry (1956) 3x MLB All-Star; 1970 AL Cy Young Award; Minnesota Twins Hall of Fame
- Duke Sims (1959)
- Dave Vineyard (1959)
- Rudy York (MGR, 1957) 7x MLB All-Star

== See also ==
North Platte Indians players
