= Pid Purdy =

American baseball and football player (1904–1951)

- Left fielder / Pinch hitter
- Born: June 15, 1904; Beatrice, Nebraska, U.S.
- Died: January 16, 1951 (aged 46); Beatrice, Nebraska, U.S.
- Batted: Left Threw: Right

MLB debut
- September 7, 1926, for the Chicago White Sox

Last MLB appearance
- September 15, 1929, for the Cincinnati Reds

MLB statistics
- Batting average: .293
- Home runs: 2
- Runs batted in: 59
- Stats at Baseball Reference

Teams
- Chicago White Sox (1926); Cincinnati Reds (1927–1929)

Everett Virgil "Pid" Purdy (June 15, 1904 – January 16, 1951) was an American professional athlete who played in both Major League Baseball and the National Football League. He was a native of Beatrice, Nebraska, and attended Beloit College. He was 5 feet 6 inches (1.68 m) tall and weighed 150 pounds (68 kg).

As a baseball player, Purdy was an outfielder who batted left-handed and threw right-handed. His professional career extended from 1923 through 1938 and much of it was spent in minor league baseball in his native Nebraska, where he toiled in the Class A Western League and the Class D Nebraska State League. He compiled a lifetime minor league batting average of .328 in 1,437 games.

Purdy also saw 181 games of Major League service with the Chicago White Sox (1926) and Cincinnati Reds (1927–1929), batting .293 with two home runs and 59 runs batted in.

Meanwhile, he played in the National Football League for the Green Bay Packers in 1926 and 1927. At 5' 6", 145 pounds, Purdy is the lightest player to ever throw a touchdown pass in the NFL. He played at the collegiate level at Beloit College.

Purdy died in his hometown of Beatrice at the age of 46.
