= Harry Cheek =

American baseball player (1879-1927)

- Catcher
- Born: April 23, 1879; Kansas City, Missouri, U.S.
- Died: August 25, 1927 (aged 48); Redwood City, California, U.S.
- Batted: Right Threw: Right

MLB debut
- April 30, 1910, for the Philadelphia Phillies

Last MLB appearance
- May 12, 1910, for the Philadelphia Phillies

MLB statistics
- Games played: 2
- At bats: 4
- Hits: 2

Teams
- Philadelphia Phillies (1910)

Harry Gordon Cheek (April 23, 1879 – August 25, 1927) was a Major League Baseball player. Cheek played for the Philadelphia Phillies in 1910. In 2 games, Cheek had 2 hits in 4 at-bats, with a .500 batting average.

Cheek was born in Kansas City, Missouri, and died in Redwood City, California.
