= Spencer Harris =

American baseball player (1900–1982)

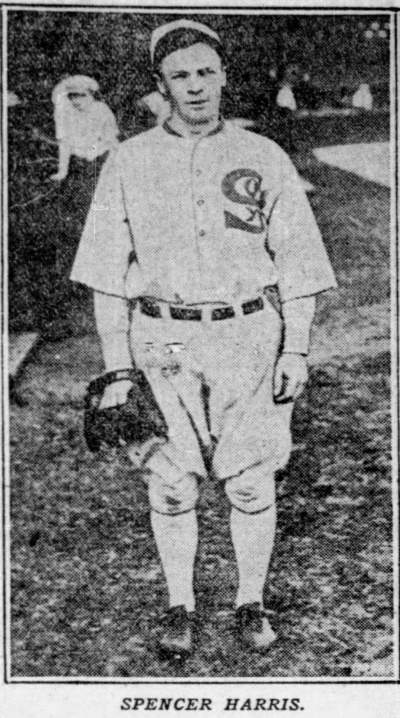
- Outfielder
- Born: August 12, 1900; Duluth, Minnesota, U.S.
- Died: July 3, 1982 (aged 81); Minneapolis, Minnesota, U.S.
- Batted: Left Threw: Left

MLB debut
- April 14, 1925, for the Chicago White Sox

Last MLB appearance
- June 14, 1930, for the Philadelphia Athletics

MLB statistics
- Batting average: .249
- Home runs: 3
- Runs batted in: 46
- Stats at Baseball Reference

Teams
- Chicago White Sox (1925–1926); Washington Senators (1929); Philadelphia Athletics (1930)

Anthony Spencer Harris (August 12, 1900 – July 3, 1982) was an American professional baseball player who appeared in 164 games in Major League Baseball for the Chicago White Sox (1925–26), Washington Senators (1929), and Philadelphia Athletics (1930). Notably, Harris played for all or parts of 26 seasons in minor league baseball (1921–24; 1927–48), appearing in over 3,100 games.

Born in Duluth, Minnesota, Harris threw and batted left-handed, stood 5 feet 9 inches (1.75 m) tall and weighed 145 pounds (66 kg). As a big-leaguer, he collected 94 hits, including 15 doubles, three triples and three home runs in two full seasons (as a member of the White Sox) and parts of two others. He hit.249 with 46 runs batted in.

Harris hit.330 in his final season as a 47-year-old outfielder for the Yakima Packers in 1948. He holds the all-time minor league records for at bats (11,377), hits (3,617), runs scored (2,287), and doubles (743), and ranks fourth all-time with 1,769 RBI.

Harris lived on Oak Grove Avenue in Minneapolis. He died on July 3, 1982, at University Hospitals in Minneapolis. He was buried in Lakewood Cemetery.
