= Art Stokes =

American baseball player (1896-1962)

- Pitcher
- Born: September 13, 1896; Emmitsburg, Maryland
- Died: June 2, 1962 (aged 65); Titusville, Pennsylvania
- Batted: Right Threw: Right

MLB debut
- May 5, 1925, for the Philadelphia Athletics

Last MLB appearance
- July 9, 1925, for the Philadelphia Athletics

MLB statistics
- Win–loss record: 1–1
- Earned run average: 4.07
- Strikeouts: 7
- Stats at Baseball Reference

Teams
- Philadelphia Athletics (1925)

Arthur Milton Stokes (September 13, 1896 – June 2, 1962) was an American professional baseball player who pitched in twelve games for the Philadelphia Athletics during the 1925 season. He was born in Emmitsburg, Maryland and died in Titusville, Pennsylvania at the age of 65.
