= Hastings, Nebraska minor league baseball history =

Hastings, Nebraska minor league baseball teams
- 1887–1959; (1887, 1892, 1910–1915, 1922–1924, 1956–1959); Hastings, Nebraska

Minor league affiliations
- Class: Independent (1882, 1892); Class D (1910–1915, 1922–1924, 1956–1959)
- League: Western League (1887); Nebraska State League (1892, 1910–1915, 1922–1923); Tri-State League (1924); Nebraska State League (1956–1959)

Major league affiliations
- Team: New York Giants (1956–1957); San Francisco Giants (1958–1959)

Minor league titles
- League titles (1): 1912

Team data
- Name: Hastings Hustlers (1887); Hastings (1892); Hastings Brickmakers (1910); Hastings Third Citys (1911–1913); Hastings Reds (1914–1915); Hastings Cubs (1922–1924); Hastings Giants (1956–1959)
- Ballpark: Duncan Field (1956–1958)

Minor league baseball teams were based in Hastings, Nebraska in various seasons between 1887 and 1959, playing under numerous nicknames. The Hastings Giants played in the short-season Class D level Nebraska State League from 1956 to 1959. Earlier Hastings teams had played as members the Nebraska State League in 1892, Western League in 1887, the Nebraska State League from 1910 to 1915 and 1922 to 1923 and the Tri-State League in 1924. The Hastings Giants were a minor league affiliate of the New York Giants from 1956 to 1957 and San Francisco Giants in 1958 and 1959 while hosting home minor league games at Duncan Field.

Baseball Hall of Fame members Fred Clarke (1892) and Dazzy Vance (1914) played for Hastings teams.

== History ==
Minor league baseball began with the Hastings Hustlers in the 1887 Western League. Hastings was a member of the Nebraska State League from 1910 to 1915 and 1922 to 1923, playing as the Reds, Cubs, Third Citys and Brickmakers. The Hastings Cubs joined the Tri-State League in 1924. The Hastings Giants were a minor league affiliate of the New York Giants from 1956 to 1957 and San Francisco Giants in 1958 and 1959.

Baseball Hall of Fame member Fred Clarke began his professional career with Hastings in 1892, hitting .302 with 14 stolen bases in 41 games.

The Hastings Third Citys won the 1912 Nebraska State League Championship, finishing first in the regular season with a record of 67–44. The Kearney Buffaloes playoff win over Hastings was later reversed at the Nebraska State League 1913 spring meeting and Hastings was awarded the championship.

Baseball Hall of Fame inductee Dazzy Vance pitched for the Hastings Reds in 1914 with a 17–4 record.

The Hastings Giants were an affiliate of the New York Giants/San Francisco Giants, playing from 1956 to 1959. The Giants played their home games at Duncan Field.

The Nebraska State League permanently folded following the 1959 season. The 1959 league member Hastings Giants, Holdrege White Sox, Grand Island Athletics, Kearney Yankees, McCook Braves and North Platte Indians franchised permanently folded as well.

== The ballpark ==
The Hastings Giants were noted to have played home minor league games at Duncan Field. Constructed in 1940 as a federal W.P.A. Project, the ballpark was considered one of the best in the Nebraska State League. Duncan Field is still in use today, having hosted multiple American Legion World Series. Duncan Field is located at 601 East South Street in Hastings, Nebraska.

== Timeline ==
Year(s)	# Yrs.	Team	Level	League	Affiliate
1887	1	Hastings Hustlers	Independent	Western League	None
1892	1	Hastings	Independent	Nebraska State League	None
1910	1	Hastings Brickmakers	Class D	Nebraska State League	None
1911–1913	3	Hastings Third Citys	Class D	Nebraska State League	None
1914–1915	2	Hastings Reds	Class D	Nebraska State League	None
1922–1923	2	Hastings Cubs	Class D	Nebraska State League	None
1924	1	Hastings Cubs	Class D	Tri-State League	None
1956–1957	2	Hastings Giants	Class D	Nebraska State League	New York Giants
1958–1959	2	Hastings Giants	Class D	Nebraska State League	San Francisco Giants

== Year–by–year records ==
Year	Record	Finish	Manager	Playoffs
1956	15–48	8th	Gene Thompson	Did not qualify
1957	29–26	5th	Leo Schrall	Did not qualify
1958	24–39	7th	Leo Schrall	Did not qualify
1959	23–39	6th	Leo Schrall	Did not qualify

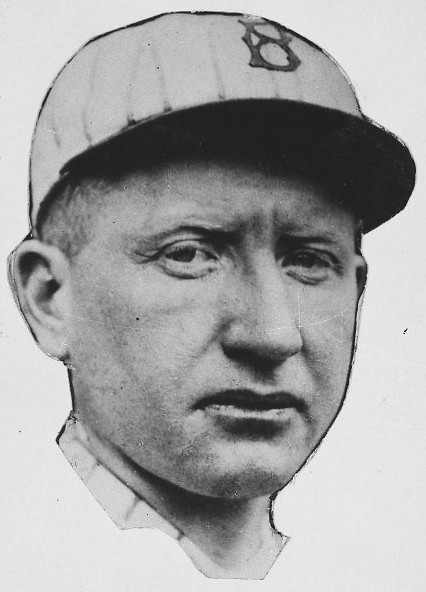
Dazzy Vance 1922

== Notable alumni ==
- Fred Clarke (1892) Inducted Baseball Hall of Fame, 1945
- Dazzy Vance (1914) Inducted Baseball Hall of Fame, 1955
- Jesus Alou (1959)
- Bob Barton (1959)
- Harry Cheek (1923)
- Jake Gettman (1914)
- Bill Hands (1959)
- Lou Koupal (1923)
- Bill Piercy (1914)
- Leo Schrall (MGR, 1957–1959)
- Jose Tartabull (1958)
- Gene Thompson (MGR, 1956)
- Jose Vidal (1958)
- Johnny Weekly (1956)
