= Joe Lotz =

American baseball player (1891–1971)

- Pitcher
- Born: January 2, 1891; Remsen, Iowa, U.S.
- Died: January 1, 1971 (aged 79); Castro Valley, California, U.S.
- Batted: Right Threw: Right

MLB debut
- July 15, 1916, for the St. Louis Cardinals

Last MLB appearance
- September 25, 1916, for the St. Louis Cardinals

MLB statistics
- Win–loss record: 0–3
- Earned run average: 4.28
- Strikeouts: 18
- Stats at Baseball Reference

Teams
- St. Louis Cardinals (1916)

Joseph Peter "Smokey" Lotz (January 2, 1891 – January 1, 1971) was an American pitcher in Major League Baseball. He played for the St. Louis Cardinals in 1916. He attended Creighton University.
