= Lee Riley =

American football player (1932–2011)

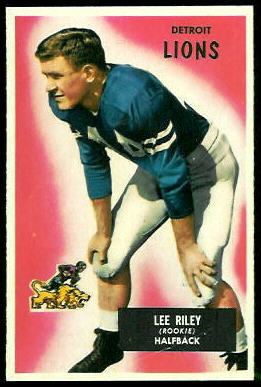
- Riley on a 1955 Bowman football card

No. 44, 22, 21
- Position: Defensive back

Personal information
- Born: August 24, 1932; Lincoln, Nebraska, U.S.
- Died: June 9, 2011 (aged 78); Chicago, Illinois, U.S.
- Listed height: 6 ft 1 in (1.85 m)
- Listed weight: 192 lb (87 kg)

Career information
- College: Detroit Mercy
- NFL draft: 1955: 4th round, 48th overall pick

Career history
- Detroit Lions (1955); Philadelphia Eagles (1956–1959); Washington Redskins (1960)*; New York Giants (1960); Chicago Bears (1961)*; New York Titans (1961-1962); New York Jets (1963)*; Jersey Giants (1963)
- * Offseason or practice squad member only

Career NFL/AFL statistics
- Interceptions: 23
- Fumble recoveries: 9
- Stats at Pro Football Reference

Leon Francis Riley Jr. (August 24, 1932 – June 9, 2011), best known as Lee Riley, was an American college and professional football defensive back. He played collegiately at the University of Detroit, in the National Football League (NFL) for the Detroit Lions, Philadelphia Eagles, and New York Giants, and in the American Football League (AFL) for the New York Titans.

Lee Riley was raised in Rome, New York where he attended St. Aloysius Academy (high school). He later attended St. Bonaventure University before transferring to the University of Detroit Mercy, where he played collegiate football. His father, Leon Riley Sr., played professional baseball and briefly played in Major League Baseball (MLB) for the Philadelphia Phillies during World War II before relocating to Rome, New York to assume role as player/manager of a minor league team in 1940s to early 1950s. Lee played college football at the University of Detroit.

He was the older brother of Pat Riley, currently president of the Miami Heat and former National Basketball Association (NBA) player, coach and broadcaster.

Lee Riley played eight-man football at St. Aloysius Academy. He then went to the University of Detroit and was drafted by the Detroit Lions. He was inducted into the Rome, New York Hall of Fame. In his last year of Professional Football he led the AFL in pass interceptions.

== See also ==
- Other American Football League players
