= McCook Generals =

The McCook Generals were a Nebraska State League baseball team based in McCook, Nebraska, United States that existed from 1928 to 1932. They were league champions in their first three years of existence, from 1929 to 1931. All league championships came while Doc Bennett was manager. The Generals were succeeded in McCook by the McCook Braves in 1956 and preceded by the McCook team of the 1903 Central Nebraska League.

== Timeline ==
Year(s)	# Yrs.	Team	Level	League
1903	1	McCook	Independent	Central Nebraska League
1928–1932	5	McCook Generals	Class D	Nebraska State League
1956–1959	4	McCook Braves	Class D	Nebraska State League
