= Fairbury Jeffersons =

Baseball team

The Fairbury Jeffersons were a Nebraska State League baseball team based in Fairbury, in the U.S. state of Nebraska, that played from 1922 to 1923 and from 1928 to 1930. They won their only league championship in their first year of existence, under manager George Segrist.
