= Harry Smith (pitcher) =

American baseball player (1889–1964)

- Pitcher
- Born: August 15, 1889; Union, Nebraska, U.S.
- Died: July 26, 1964 (aged 74); Dunbar, Nebraska, U.S.
- Batted: Right Threw: Right

MLB debut
- October 6, 1912, for the Chicago White Sox

Last MLB appearance
- October 6, 1912, for the Chicago White Sox

MLB statistics
- Win–loss record: 1–0
- Earned run average: 1.80
- Strikeouts: 1
- Stats at Baseball Reference

Teams
- Chicago White Sox (1912)

Harry Smith (August 15, 1889 – July 26, 1964) was an American baseball player with the Chicago White Sox who played one game in 1912. He was the starting pitcher, he pitched five innings for an ERA of 1.80 and is credited with a win. However, he never played in the Majors again, though he did spend the next two seasons in the Western League with the Lincoln, Nebraska minor league team.

== Sources ==
- Harry Smith recalled on Nebeaska Minor League Baseball Fremont Pathfinders
- Harry Smith sources at www.baseballibrary.com
- Career statistics from Baseball Reference · Baseball Reference (Minors) · Retrosheet · Baseball Almanac
