= Kearney Yankees =

- 1956–1959; Kearney, Nebraska

Minor league affiliations
- Class: Class D (1956–1959)
- League: Nebraska State League (1956–1959)

Major league affiliations
- Team: New York Yankees (1956–1959)

Minor league titles
- League titles: None

Team data
- Name: Kearney Yankees
- Ballpark: Kearney Memorial Field (1956–1959)

The Kearney Yankees were a minor league baseball team that played in the Class D level Nebraska State League from 1956 to 1959. Hosting home games at Kearney Memorial Field, Kearney was a minor league affiliate of the New York Yankees.

== History ==
Based in Kearney, Nebraska, the Kearney Yankees were a Class D level affiliate the New York Yankees for their four seasons of existence. The Yankees hosted minor league home games at Kearney Memorial Field.

The Nebraska State League folded after the 1959 season, along with 1959 league members Hastings Giants, Holdrege White Sox, Grand Island Athletics, Kearney Yankees, McCook Braves and North Platte Indians.

== The ballpark ==
Kearney Memorial Field was constructed in 1946 and hosted the Kearney Yankees. It is still in use today by American Legion teams and is located at 3311 8th Avenue, Kearney, Nebraska. It has been home to American Legion baseball since 1946 and serves as the home for Kearney High School Baseball.

== Year–by–year records ==
Year	Record	Finish	Manager	Playoffs
1956	35–28	3rd	Randy Gumpert	No playoffs held
1957	30–26	4th	Randy Gumpert	No playoffs held
1958	33–30	4th	Randy Gumpert	No playoffs held
1959	27–35	4th	Jim Gleeson	No playoffs held

== Notable alumni ==
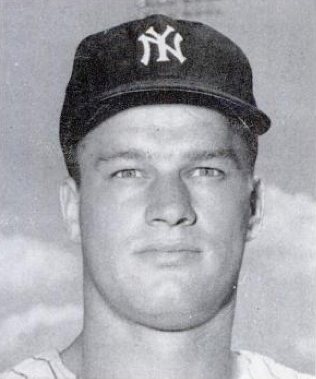
Jim Bouton, August, 1963

- Jim Bouton (1959) MLB All–Star; Author Ball Four
- Horace Clarke (1958)
- Randy Gumpert (MGR, 1956–1958) MLB All-Star
- Deron Johnson (1956)
- Phil Linz (1957)
- Pete Mikkelsen (1958)
- Hal Reniff (1956)
