= Kearney Kapitalists =

Nebraska State League team based in Kearney, Nebraska

The Kearney Kapitalists were a Nebraska State League team based in Kearney, Nebraska, United States that played from 1910 to 1914. Major league baseball players that played for them include Jerry Akers, Win Noyes, Harry Berte, Rolla Mapel, Joe Lotz, Gus Bono and Dutch Wetzel. They were managed by Berte from at least 1912 to 1914.
