= Eddie Brown (baseball) =

American baseball player (1891-1956)

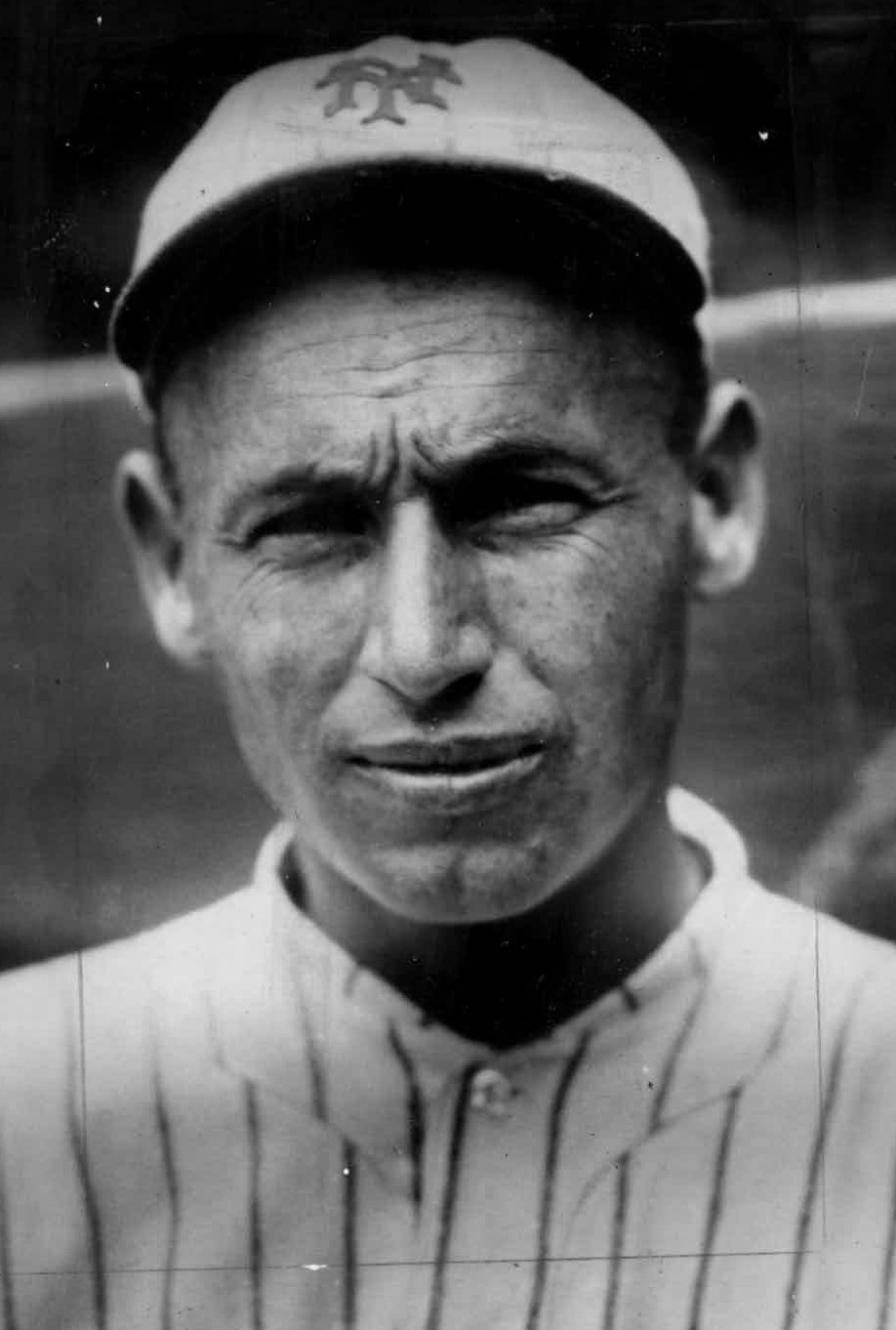
- Outfielder
- Born: July 17, 1891; Milligan, Nebraska, U.S.
- Died: September 10, 1956 (aged 65); Vallejo, California, U.S.
- Batted: Right Threw: Right

MLB debut
- September 26, 1920, for the New York Giants

Last MLB appearance
- September 29, 1928, for the Boston Braves

MLB statistics
- Batting average: .303
- Home runs: 16
- Runs batted in: 407
- Stats at Baseball Reference

Teams
- New York Giants (1920–1921); Brooklyn Robins (1924–1925); Boston Braves (1926–1928)

Edward William Brown (July 17, 1891 – September 10, 1956) was an American professional baseball outfielder. He played in Major League Baseball (MLB) for the New York Giants, Brooklyn Robins, and Boston Braves between 1920 and 1928. A .303 lifetime hitter, he led the National League with 201 hits in 1926. Brown's nickname was "Glass Arm Eddie".

In 790 games over 7 seasons, Brown compiled a .303 batting average (878-for-2902) with 341 runs, 170 doubles, 33 triples, 16 home runs, 407 RBIs, 127 base on balls, 109 strikeouts, .334 on-base percentage and .400 slugging percentage. Defensively, he recorded a .970 fielding percentage.
