= Beatrice Blues =

Former minor league baseball team

- (1892, 1912–1915, 1922–1924, 1928, 1932–1938); Beatrice, Nebraska

Minor league affiliations
- Previous classes: Independent/ Class B (1892); Class D (1912–1915, 1922–1924, 1928, 1932–1938)
- Previous leagues: Nebraska State League (1928, 1932–1938); Tri-State League (1924); Nebraska State League (1913–1915, 1922–1923); Missouri-Iowa-Nebraska-Kansas League (1912); Nebraska State League (1892)

Major league affiliations
- Previous teams: Brooklyn Dodgers (1936–1938)

Minor league titles
- League titles: 1892

Team data
- Previous names: Bearice Indians (1892); Beatrice-Fairbury Milkskimmers (1912); Beatrice Milkskimmers (1913–1915); Beatrice Blues (1922–1924, 1928, 1932–1938)
- Previous parks: Athletic Park

The Beatrice Blues was the final and primary name of the minor league baseball teams located in Beatrice, Nebraska. Beatrice teams played as members of the Nebraska State League in 1892, from 1913 to 1915, 1922 to 1923, 1928, 1932 to 1938, the Missouri-Iowa-Nebraska-Kansas League in 1912 and the Tri-State League in 1924. They were affiliated with the Brooklyn Dodgers from 1936 to 1938.

== About ==
The Beatrice Blues played at the High School Athletic Park. The field acquired lights in the early 1930s. The field still exists as the local high school football stadium. Prior to the Blues, Beatrice was represented in the Nebraska State League in 1892. In partnership with neighboring Fairbury, Nebraska, the Beatrice-Fairbury Milkskimmers played as members in the Missouri-Iowa-Nebraska-Kansas League (MINK) in 1912. The Beatrice Milkskimmers played in the Nebraska State League from 1913 until the league disbanded in 1915.

== 1892 Nebraska State League ==
A team known as the Beatrice Indians played in the Nebraska State League for the first half of the 1892 season. They were leading the league with a 27-10 record when they disbanded on July 5. The league ceased operations the next week, on July 13.

== 1912-1915 MINK and Nebraska State Leagues ==
The second incarnation of a Beatrice team started as the Beatrice-Fairbury Milkskimmers of the "MINK" League (Missouri-Iowa-Nebraska-Kansas League) in 1912. As the name suggests, the team was a collaboration with the nearby town of Fairbury, Nebraska. After the 1912 season, the team disbanded.

Beatrice did not lack a team for long, however. In the middle of the 1913 season, the Seward Statesmen of the new Nebraska State League moved to Beatrice, renaming themselves the Beatrice Milkskimmers. The team that had gone 27-37 in Seward finished the season stronger, going 25-23 after relocating.

The Milkskimmers continued to play in the Nebraska State League through 1915. The league disbanded on July 18, 1915 with the Milkskimmers leading the league with a 35-18 record.

== 1922–1923 Nebraska State League ==
In 1922, Beatrice, Nebraska was represented in the short-lived Nebraska State League by the Blues. The league had a split season. The Blues were 25–28 in the first half and 31–32 in the second half and wound up in 4th place. Ralph Kirchner managed the team until July and Ducky Holmes replaced him for the remainder of the season. The 1923 team wound up in 5th place.

== 1924 Tri-State League ==
In 1924, the Lincoln Links returned to the Western League. The remaining Nebraska State League teams and some of the teams from the collapsed South Dakota League formed the Tri-State League. The Blues were in first place when the league disbanded on July 17.

== 1928, 1932–1938 Nebraska State League ==
In 1928, the Nebraska State League was restarted with eight teams. The 1928 Blue's were led by Jack Ellison. He was named to the All Star team and the Pinconning MI native had a 15–8 record. Spud Owen averaged .343 and was also named to the All Star team. In 1929 the Norton Jayhawks took over the franchise.

When the York Dukes dropped out of the Nebraska State League after the 1931 season Beatrice reentered the league and remained through the 1938 season. The 1932 Blues were led by Mike Pociask and Cotton Pippen. During the playoffs, Cotton pitched the third game of the series and won 5–3. He came back in the sixth game of the series and pitched a 2-hitter as Beatrice won 9–0. The next day he pitched the seventh game of the series. There were 3,000 fans in the Beatrice stands. Cotton went 2 for 3 at the plate and won 4–3. He did not give up an earned run in four playoff appearances. 1933 was a near repeat of the previous year. Led by pitcher Mike Pociask they once again wound up in second place. Cotton won one of the playoff games and hit two home runs during the game. Beatrice won the playoffs 5 games to 4. 1934 and 1935 were cellar years for the team. In 1936, the team secured a working agreement with the Brooklyn Dodgers. They were in 4th place in 1936, third in 1937 and again in third in 1938.

== Year-by-year records ==
Year	Record	Finish	Manager	Playoffs
1922	53–63	4th	Ralph Kirchner / Ducky Holmes	
1923	64–68	5th	Ed Willett / Matty McGrath	
1924	35–30	1st	Ed Reichle	League Disbanded July 17
1928	64–56	3rd	Hal Brokow	
1932	59–46	2nd	Ed Reichle / Sonny Brookhaus	Won Playoffs
1933	60–46	2nd	Sonny Brookhaus	Won Playoffs
1934	38–67	4th	Sonny Brookhaus	
1935	42–69	4th	Charlie Stis / Bennie Warren	
1936	56–65	4th	Sonny Brookhaus	Lost 1st Round
1937	54–61	3rd	Lee Riley	
1938	62–54	3rd	Lee Riley	
