= Jake Gettman =

Russian baseball player (1875–1956)

- Outfielder
- Born: October 25, 1875; Frank, Russian Empire
- Died: October 4, 1956 (aged 80); Denver, Colorado, U.S.
- Batted: Switch Threw: Left

MLB debut
- August 20, 1897, for the Washington Senators

Last MLB appearance
- May 19, 1899, for the Washington Senators

MLB statistics
- Batting average: .278
- On-base percentage: .322
- Runs batted in: 78
- Stats at Baseball Reference

Teams
- Washington Senators (1897–1899)

Jake Gettman (October 25, 1875 – October 4, 1956) was a Major League Baseball outfielder with the Washington Senators from 1897 to 1899. He was the first Russian-born player in Major League history. Gettman emigrated to the United States at ten years old.
