= Superior Senators =

- 1956–1958; (1910–1914, 1956–1958); Superior, Nebraska

Minor league affiliations
- Previous classes: Class D (1910–1914, 1956–1958)
- League: Nebraska State League (1910–1914, 1956–1958)

Major league affiliations
- Previous teams: Washington Senators (1956–1958)

Minor league titles
- League titles: 1911

Team data
- Previous names: Superior Senators (1956-1958); Superior Brickmakers (1910-1914)
- Previous parks: Brodstone Memorial Park

The Superior Senators were a Minor League Baseball team, based in Superior, Nebraska. The Senators played from 1956 to 1958 in the short-season Class D level Nebraska State League as an affiliate of the Washington Senators. From 1910 to 1914, the Senators were preceded in Nebraska State League play by the Superior Brickmakers. Baseball Hall of Fame member Dazzy Vance played for the 1913 Brickmakers

== History ==
Affiliated with the Washington Senators of the American League, the Superior Senators were a charter team in the newly resurrected Nebraska State League, which had been dormant for 18 years. The After the 1958 season, the league reduced its membership from eight to six teams as the Senators and Lexington Red Sox were disbanded. The Nebraska State League itself disbanded after the 1959 season.

With a city population of 3,000, the Superior Senators played in, by far, the smallest city in the eight team Nebraska State league. The season ticket sales for the Superior Senators first season of 1956 was 559 and the average attendance at each home game was over 700.

Superior had previously hosted another Nebraska State League team, the Superior Brickmakers, who played from 1910 to 1914. The Brickmakers captured the league championship in 1911. Hall of Fame pitcher Dazzy Vance played for Superior in 1913.

=== The ballpark ===
The Senators hosted home minor league games at Brodstone Field. The ballpark had a dirt infield in the era. Built in 1948, with a seating capacity of 1,500, the field is still in use today and is located at 648 East 7th Street, Superior, Nebraska.

== Year–by–year records ==
Year	Record	Finish	Manager	Playoffs
1956	34–29	5th	Charles Ray Baker	No playoffs held
1957	27–29	7th	Charles Ray Baker	No playoffs held
1958	22–41	8th	Hal Keller	No playoffs held

== Notable alumni ==
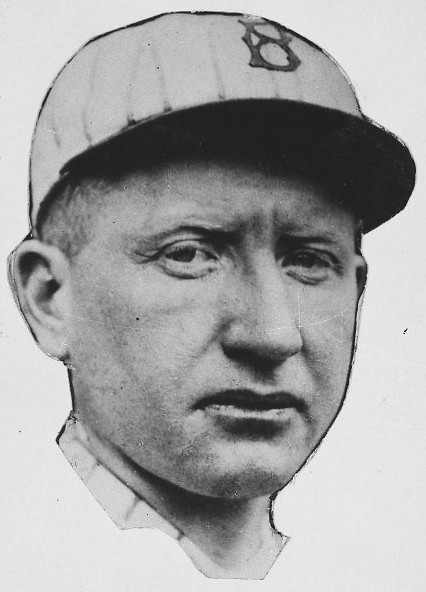
Dazzy Vance, 1922

=== Baseball Hall of Fame alumni ===
- Dazzy Vance (1913); inducted, 1955
- Jim Kaat (1957); inducted, 2022; 3 × MLB All-Star; 16 × Gold Glove; 283 lifetime wins

=== Notable alumni ===
- Eddie Brown (1913–1914)
- Bert Cueto (1956)
- Jimmie Hall (1956) 2 × MLB All-Star
- Wild Bill Luhrsen (1911)
- Walt Meinert (1913)
- Ed Monroe (1914)
