= Des Moines Boosters =

- 1900–1937; Des Moines, Iowa

Minor league affiliations
- Class: Class A (1900–1937)
- League: Western League (1900–1937)

Major league affiliations
- Team: St. Louis Browns (1937)

Minor league titles
- League titles (4): 1905; 1906; 1915; 1917

Team data
- Name: Des Moines Demons (1925–1937); Des Moines Boosters (1908–1924); Des Moines Champs (1907); Des Moines Champions (1906); Des Moines Underwriters (1905); Des Moines Prohibitionists (1904); Des Moines Undertakers (1903); Des Moines Midgets (1902); Des Moines Hawkeyes (1900–1901)
- Ballpark: Western League Park (1912–1937)

The Des Moines Boosters was the longest-used name of a Western League minor league baseball team based in Des Moines, Iowa, United States that existed from 1900 to 1937. Des Moines fielded teams in the Western League from 1900-1937 and 1947–1958.

Hall of Famers George Davis and Red Faber played for the Des Moines Boosters.

== History ==
The Des Moines Boosters won two Western League championships - their first in 1915 under manager Frank Isbell and their second in 1917 under Jack Coffey.

Des Moines had first fielded a Western League team in 1900, playing under several monikers before being called the "Boosters." At the time, the league was a Class A league, the highest level of minor league play. The teams that directly preceded the Des Moines Boosters in Western League play were the Des Moines Hawkeyes (1900–1901), Des Moines Midgets (1902), Des Moines Undertakers (1903), Des Moines Prohibitionists (1904), Des Moines Underwriters (1905), Des Moines Champions (1906) and Des Moines Champs (1907) before becoming the Des Moines Boosters (1908–1924). Des Moines won Western league Championships in 1905 and 1906, leading to the championship reference monikers.

The Des Moines Demons continued play the Western League, playing in the league from 1925–1937. The Western League did not play in 1938, but resumed in 1938 without a Des Moines franchise.

The Des Moines Bruins rejoined the Western League in 1947. The Des Moines Bruins remained in the Western League until it folded in 1958.

== Demons' Seasons ==
1925 In 1925 the Des Moines Boosters of the Western League became the Des Moines Demons. The club from Des Moines, Iowa broke in in fine form, winning the pennant with a 98–70 record, one game ahead of the Denver Bears. The Demons had six representatives on the All-Star team: First baseman Charles Stuvengen collected 229 hits, 18 of which were triples, to complement a .349, which was fifth in the Western League. Outfielder Sam Langford hit .339 with a league leading 160 runs. Outfielder Pug Griffin hit .320 with 23 home runs, catcher Homer Haworth hit .295, pitcher Herm Holshouser posted a record of 19–8 and pitcher Claude Thomas went 19–6. Leo Moon went 22–13 with 127 strikeouts on the season and tied for third in the league in wins and strikeouts. Left off of the All-Star team was the most productive hitter in the Triple Crown categories, Dutch Wetzel, who batted .353 and was second in the league with 32 homers.

1926 The Demons repeated as champions in 1926, winning another close race. Their 99–64 record gave them fewer wins than the Oklahoma City Indians, though they finished with two fewer losses and a half-game margin of victory overall. Oklahoma City claimed that other clubs (the Wichita Izzies, Lincoln Links and Tulsa Oilers) threw games to Des Moines but Western League president Mike Sexton cleared all involved parties. Des Moines lost a Mid-Western Championship to the Three-I League champion Springfield Senators team by a three games to one margin. The Demons had been led by Moon (an All-Star with a 24–8 record) and Pat Malone (28–13, second in the league in wins and first with 190 strikeouts) on the mound and Wetzel (.352 batting average, 18 home runs, sixth in average and tied for third with 394 total bases) and Griffin (an All-Star again with a .345 average and 18 homers). 40-year-old player-manager Shano Collins batted .315 with 14 home runs.

1927 Collins tied for the team lead with 11 home runs and hit .331 at age 41 in 1927 but the team fell to third at 82–72. Langford returned and led the league in hitting (.409), triples (28) and steals (31, tied for the lead with Wilbur Swansboro). He was tied for fourth in doubles (47), second in hits (250) and fourth in total bases (377). Joining him on the All-Star team were C Joe Sprinz who batted .314, utility man Al Van Camp who hit .309 with 11 home runs and pitcher Fred Ortman who went 21–11. Claude Davenport, who went 21–10, and Ortman tied for second in the league in wins; Davenport was also second in innings worked at 289. 1928 The bottom fell out for Des Moines in 1928 as they finished last in the first half (28–50) and last overall (62–98). The one bright spot was Van Camp's hitting, as he was fifth in the league with 19 triples, hit .351 and led the club with 15 homers. Three pitchers lost 16 or more games.

1929 The next year brought a slight improvement to 72–86 and 7th place in the 8-team Western League. A player named Circle, whose full name is unknown, hit 26 homers, which was fifth in the Western League. 1930 The 1930 campaign saw Des Moines return to the first division with a 77–71 record and fourth-place finish. Van Camp was fourth in the circuit with a .344 average and fifth with 18 homers. All-Stars were first baseman Jim Oglesby who hit .308 with 100 RBI, outfielder Stan Keyes who hit .340 with 35 HR, 358 total bases and 140 RBI was an All-Star as well. He was 6th in average, first in homers, RBI and total bases, fifth in runs with 123 and he tied for third in the league with 18 triples. Pitcher Bud Tinning, who went 16–11 with a 4.39 ERA, was an All-Star as well. 1931 Des Moines duked it out with the Wichita Aviators throughout the 1931 season. The Demons went 39–26 to finish second in the first half, three games behind Wichita, then won 55 of 80 second-half contests to finish six and a half games ahead of the Aviators. In the championship, the Demons won four of six games. All three 1930 All-Stars returned and again made the All-Star team – Oglesby hit .341 which was 5th in the league to go along with 119 runs, 106 RBI, 200 hits (second-most) and 278 total bases (fifth); Tinning went 24–2 with a league-leading 3.11 ERA and was second in wins and first in winning percentage; Keyes won the Triple crown with a .369 average, 38 homers and 160 RBI, which were 22 more than anyone else. He also led with 401 total bases (111 more than the next player) and 203 hits. Joining them as All-Stars were outfielder Mike Kreevich who hit .329, and P Jack Knight who went 17–7 with a 3.30 ERA, which ranked second in the league. Jim Grant went 12–11 with a 3.48 ERA, the fifth-best mark, while Johnny Niggeling was 17–12 with a 3.65 ERA. 1932 The 1932 Demons finished third in the first half (36–30) but skidded down to 35–42 in the concluding segment of the season. Oglesby made his third All-Star team in a row and finished fifth in the league with 19 triples. Jim hit .385 with nine homers and 86 RBI.

1933 Des Moines won the most games in the Western League in 1933 at 81–47 but finished one and a half games behind the leader in both halves of the season. All-Star outfielder Leo Ogorek, who hit .321, led the league with 60 stolen bases and was fourth with 108 runs scored. Pitcher Al Gizelbach went 18–10, placing him fifth in wins, fourth in winning percentage and third with 203 strikeouts. Roy Hudson, who hit .348 with 16 homers and Mort Cooper, who went 7–5 both split the season between Des Moines and the Muskogee Oilers.

1934 An unusual situation occurred in 1934 when Des Moines, the St. Joseph Saints and Sioux City Cowboys all posted identical 36–23 first-half records and none won the second half (Des Moines was 32–33, behind St. Joseph and ahead of Sioux City). A four-team playoff resulted with Des Moines facing the second-half champion Davenport Blue Sox while the Saints and Cowboys squared off. Davenport beat the Demons three games to one to advance to the finals. Ogorek, who hit .316, again stole the most bases with 38, tied for the hit lead (164, also a 3-way tie) and was tied for second with 108 runs. Hudson hit .318 and led the loop with 94 RBI and Fabian Gaffke hit .311 and was second with 93 RBI, tied for fourth with 163 hits, second with 17 triples, tied for fourth with 15 homers and first with 269 total bases.

1935 The Western League eliminated the split-season format in 1935 and the Demons finished third at 58–55. In the playoffs they were swept in three games by the Saints. Ogorek hit .317 and was among the leaders in outfield fielding percentage (.984, third-best), steals (25, 2 behind the leader), hits (144, third-best) and runs (92, one behind the leader) while August Luther, who hit .306, was third in homers at 15 and second with 14 triples. Claude Passeau was the staff ace at 20–11 and led the Western League in wins, strikeouts (239) and innings hurled (244).

1936 The 1936 edition of the Des Moines Demons went 33–33 to finish fifth in the first half of the revived split-season system. They were 31–31 and third in the second half in the six-team Western League. All-Stars were pitcher Hal Turpin who went 20–10 with a 2.74 ERA, centerfielder Jim Asbell who hit .284 and catcher Hack Wilson (not the Hall of Fame player), who hit .267. Asbell tied for fourth with 13 homers. Keyes returned to blast 20 homers (second-best in the league) with 233 total bases, which was fourth best. Van Camp came back with 148 hits (fifth in the league) and tied for the league lead with 14 triples. Turpin led the league in complete games (28) and wins, was second in innings (259), third in ERA and fifth with 124 strikeouts. Julio Bonnetti, who went 14–13 with a 2.56 ERA had the best ERA in the Western League that year.

1937 In 1937 Des Moines went 32–31 to finish second in the first half then went 25–31 in the second half as the league was crumbling. All-Stars were catcher Bus Payton who hit .276, utility man Walt Menke who hit .293 and southpaw pitcher Art McDougall who went 16–11 with a 4.02 ERA. McDougall led the Western League in complete games (24) and innings (233) and was third in wins while teammate Gil Gebo (11–15, 4.63) was fourth in innings (216), games pitched (36) and losses. Henry Martínez hit just .216 but led the team in homers (12, which ranked fifth in the Western League) and steals (28, which was third most). He struck out the most (107 times) as well. Bob Allaire hit 2.84 and was among the leaders in walks (95, tied for second) and runs (94, fourth-most) while leading with 34 steals. Harry Hughes, who hit .303, drew 109 walks, the most in the circuit. The Demons were affiliated with the St. Louis Browns in 1937.

== The ballparks ==
From 1912–1924 the Des Moines Boosters played home games at Western League Park, also known as Holcomb Avenue Park or just Holcomb Park. The ballpark had a maximum capacity of 12,000 (1930). It was on the northwest corner of Holcomb Avenue (south, home plate) and Seventh Street (east, right field), near the Des Moines River (west, left field).

The park opened on April 14, 1912, with the Boosters defeating Ottumwa 10-3.[Des Moines Register, April 15, 1912, p.6]

On May 2, 1930, Western League Park and the Des Moines Demons hosted the first night game played under permanent light standards. The ballgame was partially broadcast nationally on NBC.

Today, the site contains Des Moines North High School's Grubb Community Stadium. Seventh Street no longer cuts through the area. The high school stadium is on the northwest corner of Holcomb Avenue and Sixth Street.

Prior to Western League Park, the Des Moines clubs played at these locations, as listed in contemporary city directories:

- 1887–1897 Athletic Park, south of West Elm Street and west of South Seventh Street, also given as "foot of Seventh Street"
- 1900–1908 West of Fourth Street between Grand Avenue and Chestnut Street, west side of river
- 1909–1911 Northeast corner of East Walnut Street and 20th Street, east side of river

== Notable alumni ==
=== Baseball Hall of Fame alumni ===
- George Davis
- Red Faber

=== Notable alumni ===
- Mack Allison
- Goat Anderson
- Art Bader
- Ira Belden
- Joe Benz
- Ping Bodie
- Eli Cates
- Felix Chouinard
- George Clark
- Jack Coffey
- Guy Cooper
- Red Corriden
- Nick Cullop
- Jack Dalton
- Charlie Dexter
- Joe Dolan
- Phil Douglas
- Bernie Duffy
- Bill Fetzer
- Ray Flaskamper
- Gene Ford
- Ray French
- Jack Gilligan
- Peaches Graham
- Jack Graney
- Jim Grant
- Ed Hahn
- Raymond Haley
- Bruce Hartford
- Ziggy Hasbrook
- Irv Higginbotham
- Shags Horan
- Bernie Hungling
- Bill Hunter
- Frank Isbell
- Tex Jones
- Red Kelly
- Ed Kinsella
- Joe Klugmann
- Cliff Knox
- Art Kores
- Frank Lange
- Joe Leonard
- Willie Ludolph
- Del Mason
- Wally Mattick
- Red McDermott
- Polly McLarry
- Frank McManus
- Paul Meloan
- Billy Meyer
- Horace Milan
- Frank Miller
- Danny Moeller
- George Mogridge
- Buzz Murphy
- Paul Musser
- Andy Nelson
- Bert Niehoff
- Lefty O'Doul
- Fred Olmstead
- Harry Patton
- George Payne
- Herman Pillette
- Tom Reilly
- Clint Rogge
- Carl Sawyer
- Frank Schneiberg
- Paul Sentell
- Al Shaw
- Camp Skinner
- Phil Slattery
- Claude Thomas
- Art Thomason
- Bert Whaling
- Earl Whitehill
- Clyde Williams
- Mutt Williams
- Mike Wilson
- George Winn
- Roy Witherup
- George Yeager
- Moses J. Yellow Horse
