= Wichita Indians (baseball) =

- 1950–1955; Wichita, Kansas

Minor league affiliations
- Class: Class A (1950–1955)
- League: Western League (1950–1955)

Major league affiliations
- Team: St. Louis Browns (1950); Cleveland Indians (1951–1952); St. Louis Browns (1953); Baltimore Orioles (1954–1955)

Minor league titles
- League titles (1): 1955
- Wild card berths (2): 1950; 1951

Team data
- Name: Wichita Indians (1950–1955)
- Ballpark: Lawrence-Dumont Stadium (1950–1955); McDonald Stadium (1950–1955)

The Wichita Indians were a minor league baseball franchise based in Wichita, Kansas. The "Indians" played as members of the Class A level Western League from 1950 to 1955, winning the 1955 league Championship. The Wichita Indians were an affiliate of the 1950 St. Louis Browns in 1950, Cleveland Indians from 1951 to 1952, St. Louis Browns in 1953 and Baltimore Orioles in 1954 and 1955.

In 1956, the Indians were succeeded by the Class AAA level Wichita Braves, when the Wichita franchise became a member of the American Association.

== History ==
Wichita first hosted minor league baseball in 1887, when the "Wichita" team played as members of the Kansas State League. The Wichita Indians were preceded in Western League membership by the Wichita Aviators, who played in the league from 1929 to 1933. The Wichita Larks (1927–1928), Wichita Izzies (1923–1926), Wichita Witches (sometimes called the Wichita Wolves) (1917–1922) and Wichita Jobbers (1905–1920) teams were also Western League members.

The 1950 Wichita Indians rejoined the Western League, playing as a minor league affiliate of the St. Louis Browns. The Western League had reformed in 1947 with six teams: Denver Bears, Des Moines Bruins, Lincoln A's, Omaha Cardinals, Pueblo Dodgers and Sioux City Soos. All six clubs remained in 1950, when the league expanded to eight teams, adding the Colorado Springs Sky Sox and Wichita Indians as members.

The 1950 Indians ended the season with a 77–77 record, placing fourth in the Western League regular season standings, playing the season under manager Joe Schultz. In the playoffs, Wichita defeated the first–place Omaha Cardinals 3 games to 0 in the semifinals. In the league Finals, Wichita lost 3 games to 1 to the Sioux City Soos. The Indians drew 126,729 fans, ranking fifth in the league.

In 1951, Wichita became an affiliate of the Cleveland Indians and finished 84–68, placing third in the standings. In the Western League playoffs, Wichita was defeated by the Denver Bears 3 games to 1 as Joe Schultz returned as manager.

The 1952 Indians finished in a tie for sixth place with the Lincoln A's in the eight–team Western League with an 67–87 record. Wichita finished 22.0 games behind the Denver Bears in the final regular season standings and did not quality for the playoffs. Ralph Winegarner was the manager.

Becoming a St. Louis Browns affiliate, the Wichita Indians finished in last place in 1953, playing under managers George Hausmann, George Kovach and Mark Christman. Wichita ended the season with a record of 58–96 and finished 37.0 games behind the Colorado Springs Sky Sox in the eight–team Western League regular season standings. Wichita had attendance of 68,683 fans, seventh best in the Western League.

In 1954, the Indians became affiliates of the Baltimore Orioles after the St. Louis Browns relocated. The Indians ended the season with a 76–77 record, and in sixth place in the regular season standings of the eight team Western League. Playing under managers Herb Brett and Les Layton, Wichita did not qualify for the Western League playoffs, finishing 19.0 games behind the first place Denver Bears. The 1954 home season attendance was 87,854, fourth in the league.

Wichita won the 1955 Western League championship. In the regular season, the 1955 Indians finished in a tie for third place at 78–73 and began a Western League championship run, playing under manager Bud Bates. First, the Indians defeated the Des Moines Bruins in a third-place tie–breaker game. In the playoffs, the Indians beat the Pueblo Dodgers 3 games to 1 in the semifinals to advance. Advancing to the finals, Wichita beat the Des Moines Bruins 3 games to 1 to claim the 1955 Western League championship. Bob Harrison pitched a no–hitter for Wichita in the finals.

The Western League continued play in 1956 without a Wichita franchise, before the league permanently folded after the 1958 season. After their 1955 Western League championship, Wichita had a new team in new league in 1956. The Triple-A level American Association member Toledo Sox relocated to Wichita and the Wichita Braves were formed and began a tenure as members in the league, playing as an affiliate of the Milwaukee Braves.

== The ballparks ==
The Wichita Indians hosted minor league home games at historic Lawrence-Dumont Stadium. The ballpark was built in 1934 and was demolished in 2019. Lawrence-Dumont Stadium was replaced on the site by Riverfront Stadium in 2020.

The Indians were noted to have played some games at Central Park Stadium in El Dorado, Kansas during the July and August months. Today, the stadium is called McDonald Stadium.

== Timeline ==
Year(s)	# Yrs.	Team	Level	League	Affiliate	Ballpark
1950	1	Wichita Indians	Class A	Western League	St. Louis Browns	Lawrence-Dumont Stadium
1951–1952	2	Wichita Indians	Class A	Western League	Cleveland Indians	Lawrence-Dumont Stadium
1953	1	Wichita Indians	Class A	Western League	St. Louis Browns	Lawrence-Dumont Stadium
1954–1955	2	Wichita Indians	Class A	Western League	Baltimore Orioles	Lawrence-Dumont Stadium

== Year–by–year records ==
Year	Record	Finish	Manager	Playoffs/Notes
1950	77–77	4th	Joe Schultz	Lost league finals
1951	84–68	3rd	Joe Schultz	Lost in 1st round
1952	67–87	6th (t)	Ralph Winegarner	Did not qualify
1953	58–96	8th	George Hausmann (18–30); George Kovach (1–1) / Mark Christman (39–65)	Did not qualify
1954	76–77	6th	Herb Brett (12–23) / Les Layton (64–54)	Did not qualify
1955	78–73	3rd	Bud Bates	Won league championship

== Notable alumni ==
- Bobby Balcena (1950)
- Bud Bates (1955, MGR)
- Jack Bruner (1952)
- Mike Blyzka (1950)
- Mark Christman (1953, MGR)
- Perry Currin (1950)
- George Elder (1950)
- Johnny Goryl (1955)
- Lenny Green (1955)
- Bob Harrison (1955)
- George Hausmann (1953)
- Mel Held (1950, 1953)
- Hal Hudson (1955)
- Julián Ladera (1953)
- Don Larsen (1950) 1956 World Series M.V.P.
- Garland Lawing (1954)
- Les Layton (1954)
- Chuck Locke (1953)
- Harry MacPherson (1951)
- Don Minnick (1951)
- Don Mossi (1951) MLB All-Star
- Jim Pisoni (1953)
- Carl Powis (1950)
- Joe Schultz (1950-1951, MGR)
- Jim Snyder (1955)
- Bob Turley (1950) 3x MLB All-Star; 1958 AL Cy Young Award; 1958 World Series M.V.P.
- Lefty Wallace (1952)
- Tommy Warren (1954-1955)

== See also ==
- Wichita Indians players
