= Lake Buchanan =

Lake Buchanan or Buchanan Lake may refer to the following:

- Buchanan Lake (Minnesota)
- Lake Buchanan (Texas)
- Lake Buchanan (Queensland)
- Lake Buchanan (Western Australia)
- Lake Buchanan (Nunavut)/Buchanan Lake (Nunavut)
- Buchanan Lake (Nova Scotia)
