= Wichita Aviators (baseball) =

- (1905–1933); Wichita, Kansas

Minor league affiliations
- Previous classes: Class-A (1909–1933); Class-C (1905–1908)
- Previous leagues: Western League (1909–1933); Western Association (1905–1908)

Major league affiliations
- Previous teams: Chicago Cubs (1932); Pittsburgh Pirates (1930–1931)

Minor league titles
- League titles: 4 (1905, 1907, 1921, 1930)

Team data
- Previous names: Muskogee Oilers (end-1933); Wichita Oilers (1933); Wichita Aviators (1929–1932); Wichita Larks (1927–1928); Wichita Izzies (1923–1926); Wichita Witches (1912–1917, 1921–1922); Wichita Jobbers (1905–1911, 1918–1920); Colorado Springs Millionaires (end-1916); Pueblo Indians (end-1911)
- Ballpark: Island Park (1918–1933); Unknown (1905–1917)

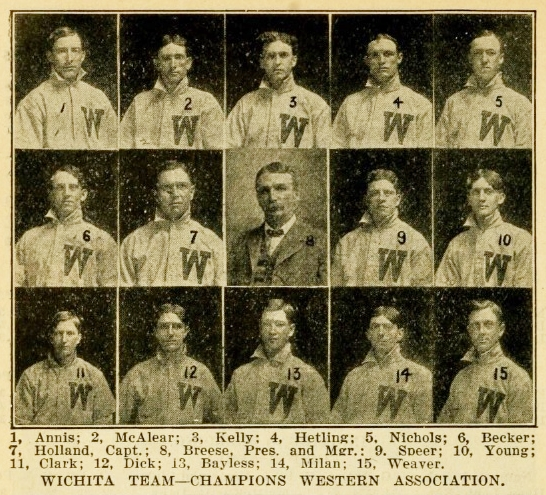
The 1907 Wichita Jobbers

The Wichita Aviators were a minor league baseball team based in Wichita, Kansas from 1905 to 1933. Wichita was a member of the Western Association (1905–1908) and Western League (1909–1933).

== History ==
The club played mostly in the Western League. However, the club began play as the Wichita Jobbers, a member of the Western Association. The Jobbers played in the Western Association from 1905 to 1908, winning the league championship in 1905 and 1907. The 1907 Jobbers were recognized as one of the 100 greatest minor league teams of all time. The Jobbers then moved to the Western League, where they played until midway through their 1911 season. That year, the team relocated to Pueblo, Colorado, where they finished out the year as the Pueblo Indians.

However, a team representing Wichita was fielded in 1912 to compete in the Western League. The Wichita Witches played continuously in the league until 1916. The team finished their 1916 season in Colorado Springs, Colorado as the Colorado Springs Millionaires, before returning to Wichita in 1917. The team was again renamed the Jobbers from 1918 to 1920, before retaking the Witches moniker as they won their third league title, the first in the Western League, in 1921. From 1923 to 1926, the club was renamed the Wichita Izzies, and they took the name the Wichita Larks from 1927 to 1929.

In 1919, Jobbers outfielder Joe Wilhoit posted the longest hitting streak in professional baseball history. The 33-year-old, who had spent much of the previous three seasons in the majors, hit safely in 69 consecutive games. Wilhoit's streak lasted from June 14 to August 19, during which he was 153-for-297 for a .515 batting average. He would lead the Western League with a .422 batting average and 211 hits before finishing the season (and his big league career) with the Boston Red Sox.

Multiple Izzies players had or would go on to have major league experience.

1923: Johnny Butler, Joe Casey, Jocko Conlan, Howie Gregory, Ed Hovlik, Ernie Maun, Hugh McMullen, Paul Musser

1924: Fred Beck, Butler, Archie Campbell, Chuck Corgan, Gregory, Hovlik, McMullen, Musser

1925: Campbell, Chet Chadbourne, Corgan, Fred Graf, Gregory, Raymond Haley, Don Hankins, Hovlik, McMullen, Ray Morehart, Ken Penner, Bill Sweeney

1926: Jack Berly, Fred Brickell, Campbell, Pete Compton, Bill Doran, Gregory, Haley, Sweeney

In 1920, the club was renamed the Wichita Aviators, and from 1930 to 1931 they became an affiliate of the Pittsburgh Pirates. In 1931, the Aviators won their second Western league title, and fourth overall league title. The Aviators affiliation changed in 1932 from the Pirates to the Chicago Cubs.

Former Aviators include Indian Bob Johnson, Woody Jensen, Vern Kennedy, Jack Mealey, and Hall of Famer Arky Vaughan.

In 1933 the Wichita Aviators became the Wichita Oilers. After beginning the year 6–13, the club moved to Muskogee, Oklahoma, where they became the Muskogee Oilers. Overall the Oilers were 26–95, one of the worst records ever posted in the Western League. The club was just 20–82 after leaving Wichita, and only went 8–57 in the second half. The Oilers did not return in 1934 and Wichita would not have another team until the Wichita Indians began play in 1950.

== Season records ==
Year	Record	Finish	Manager	Notes
1905	79–56	1st	William Kimmell	League Champs
1906	75–65	3rd	William Kimmell / Jack Holland	
1907	98–35	1st	Jack Holland	League Champs
1908	87–53	2nd	Jack Holland	
1909	71–82	5th	Jack Holland	
1910	89–78	4th	Frank Isbell	
1911	15–9	–	Frank Isbell	Team moved to Pueblo (77–66) May 22
1912	75–89	7th	George Hughes	
1913	65–101	8th	George Hughes / Charlie Babb / Nick Maddox	
1914	63–102	8th	Nick Maddox / George Graham	
1915	57–80	7th	Clyde "Buzzy" Wares / Ham Patterson	
1916	55–84	–	Jimmy Jackson	Team moved to Colorado Springs (2–10) September 10
1917	61–87	8th	Frank Isbell / Bobby Wallace / Joe Berger	
1918	41–24	1st	Joe Berger	League suspended operations July 7
1919	75–65	3rd	Joe Berger	
1920	92–62	2nd	Joe Berger	
1921	106–61	1st	Joe Berger	League Champs
1922	94–73	3rd	Joe Berger / Howie Gregory	
1923	100–68	3rd	Howie Gregory	
1924	79–88	6th	Howie Gregory	
1925	80–84	4th	Howie Gregory	
1926	58–108	8th	Howie Gregory / Pat Haley	
1927	91–63	2nd	Doc Crandall	
1928	94–70	3rd	Doc Crandall / Art Griggs	
1929	77–79	4th	Art Griggs	
1930	89–56	1st	Art Griggs	League Champs
1931	92–58	2nd	Art Griggs / Howie Gregory	Lost League Finals vs. Des Moines Demons 4 games to 2.
1932	63–86	6th	Jimmy Payton	
1933	6–13	–	Rube Marquard	Team moved to Muskogee (20–82) on June 6, 1933
