= George Knothe =

American baseball player (1898–1981)

- Shortstop
- Born: January 12, 1898; Bayonne, New Jersey, U.S.
- Died: July 3, 1981 (aged 83); Toms River, New Jersey, U.S
- Batted: Right Threw: Right

MLB debut
- April 25, 1932, for the Philadelphia Phillies

Last MLB appearance
- May 25, 1932, for the Philadelphia Phillies

MLB statistics
- Games played: 6
- At bats: 12
- Hits: 1
- Stats at Baseball Reference

Teams
- Philadelphia Phillies (1932)

George Bertram Knothe (January 12, 1898 – July 3, 1981) was an American professional baseball player. He played in Major League Baseball as an infielder for one season with the Philadelphia Phillies in 1932 however, he played in minor league baseball from 1922 to 1934. His brother, Fritz Knothe also played in Major League Baseball as a third baseman. Knothe was known as a sure-handed defensive player.

== Baseball career ==
Knothe was born in Bayonne, New Jersey and graduated from high school in 1917. He began his professional baseball career in 1922 at the age of 24 with the Newark Bears of the International League. He graduated from the University of Pennsylvania in 1925. In 1926, he posted a .354 batting average with the Lawrence Merry Macks of the New England League.

In 1928, he had a career year with the Pueblo Steel Workers of the Western League when, he hit .318 in 164 games with 41 doubles, 17 triples, and six home runs. His impressive performance earned him a job with the Kansas City Blues of the American Association. His strong defensive play helped the Blues win the 1929 Little World Series over the Rochester Red Wings. In 1931, the Blues sent Knothe to the New Orleans Pelicans of the Southern Association where, he became known as one of the best defensive shortstops in the league.

The Philadelphia Phillies selected Knothe in the Rule 5 draft on September 30, 1931. He made his major league debut with the Phillies at the relatively late age of 34 on April 25, 1932 in a game against the Boston Red Sox that, also featured his brother Fritz playing as the Red Sox third baseman. Four days later at Philadelphia's Baker Bowl, he collected his only major-league hit, a double off of Brooklyn pitcher Van Lingle Mungo. The presence of veteran player Dick Bartell relegated Knothe to the role of utility player. After only one month in the major leagues, a new Depression-era rule limiting teams to 23 players would lead the Phillies to send him to the Fort Worth Cats of the Class A Texas League.

Knothe returned to play for the New Orleans Pelicans in 1933, helping the team win the Dixie Series against the Texas League's San Antonio Missions. He played his final season in organized baseball with the Memphis Chickasaws of the Southern Association. Knothe continued to play baseball for semi-pro teams until the age of 39.

== Career statistics ==
In a twelve-year minor league career, Knothe played in 1,131 games, accumulating 1,165 hits in 4,196 at bats for a .277 career batting average, along with 23 home runs. He appeared in 6 major league games, getting 1 hit in 12 at bats and scored 2 runs.

== Later life ==
After his baseball-playing career, Knothe served for 29 years as a supervisor for Curtiss-Wright Aeronautics in Woodbridge, New Jersey, before retiring in 1965. He also was a World War II Air Force veteran. George Knothe died on July 3, 1981, and is buried in St. Joseph Catholic Cemetery and Mausoleum in Toms River, New Jersey.
