= Kirby White =

American baseball player (1884–1943)

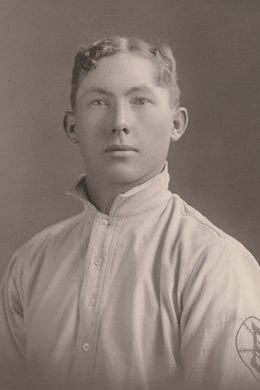
- Pitcher
- Born: January 3, 1884; Hillsboro, Ohio, U.S.
- Died: April 22, 1943 (aged 59); Hillsboro, Ohio, U.S.
- Batted: Left Threw: Right

MLB debut
- May 4, 1909, for the Boston Doves

Last MLB appearance
- May 24, 1911, for the Pittsburgh Pirates

MLB statistics
- Win–loss record: 17–25
- Earned run average: 3.24
- Strikeouts: 102
- Stats at Baseball Reference

Teams
- Boston Doves (1909–1910); Pittsburgh Pirates (1910–1911)

Oliver Kirby White (January 3, 1884 – April 22, 1943) was an American professional baseball pitcher. He played in Major League Baseball (MLB) from 1909 to 1911 for the Boston Doves and Pittsburgh Pirates. His minor league career began in 1907.

In 1907, White pitched for the Lancaster Lanks, going 15–16 in 34 games. In 40 games with the Lanks in 1908, he went 28–12, allowing 216 hits in 363 innings of work.

On May 4, 1909, White made his big league debut. In his rookie season, he went 6–13 with a 3.22 ERA in 23 games (19 starts). He had 11 complete games and one shutout that season. White began the 1910 season with the Doves, going 1–2 with a 1.38 ERA in three games with them. On April 28, he was traded to the Pirates for Sam Frock and Bud Sharpe. With the Pirates, he went 10–9 with a 3.46 ERA in 30 games; overall, he went 11–11 with a 3.16 ERA in 33 games. He played his final big league season in 1911, going 0–1 with a 9.00 ERA in two games for the Pirates. On May 24, 1911, he appeared in his final big league game. He also pitched for the Indianapolis Indians in 1911, going 2–2.

Although his big league career was over, his professional career was not, as he played professionally until 1915 for the Sioux City Packers and Sioux City Indians. For the Packers in 1912, he went 16–12 in 38 games. He appeared in 43 games with them in 1913, posting a 3.03 ERA. With the Indians in 1914, he went 18–10 with a 3.14 ERA. He went 2–7 with a 4.58 ERA for them in 1915.

Overall, White went 17–25 with a 3.24 ERA in 58 big league games (44 starts). He had 21 complete games and four shutouts.

Following his death in 1943, he was interred at Hillsboro Cemetery in Hillsboro, Ohio.

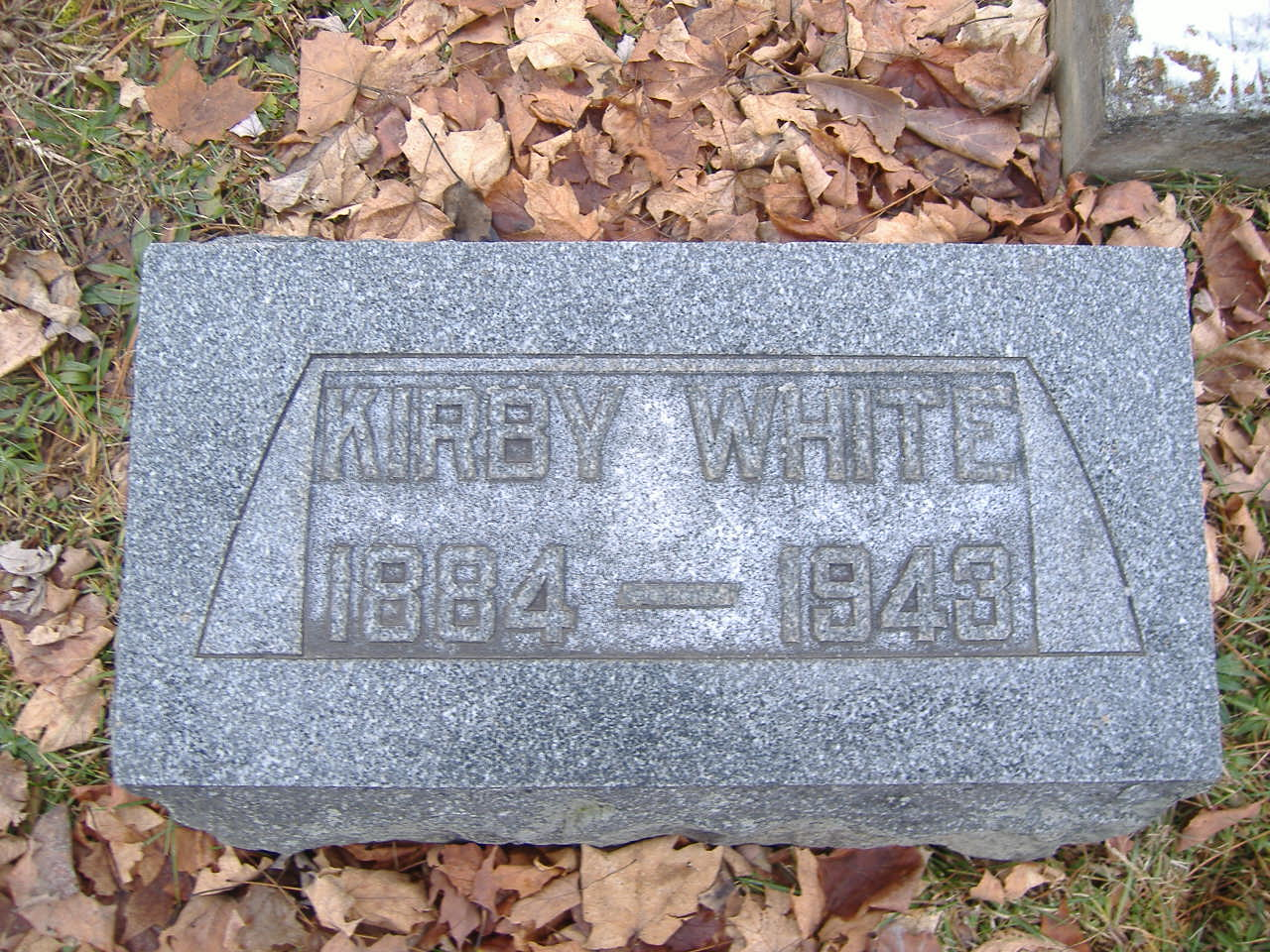
Headstone of Kirby White at Hillsboro Cemetery in Hillsboro, Ohio.
