= Western League (1900–1958) =

Former US baseball organization

- Most recent season or competition: 1958 Western League season
- Classification: Class A Class B Class D
- Sport: Baseball
- First season: 1885
- Folded: 1958
- President: Roy Carter (1937–1941); Edwin C. Johnson (1947–1955); O'Neal M. Hobbs (1956–1958)
- Country: United States

The Western League was the name of several American sports leagues in Minor League Baseball. This article concentrates on the Western Leagues that operated from 1900 to 1937 and from 1947 to 1958.

Its earliest progenitor, the Western League of 1885–1899, was the predecessor of the American League. Later, during the 20th century, there were four incarnations of the Western League, including the Western League of 1939–1941 (succeeding the Nebraska State League) that played at the Class D level, and an independent baseball league that operated as the Western Baseball League from 1995 to 2002.

== History ==
The league's longest-serving franchise was located in Des Moines, Iowa, which joined the WL in 1900 and played continuously through 1937, when the league shut down during the Great Depression. Des Moines then rejoined the reborn Western circuit when Senator Edwin C. Johnson from Colorado founded it in 1947; this team, a Chicago Cubs affiliate called the Des Moines Bruins, then played for the final 12 years of the league's existence.

Minor league baseball went unclassified through 1901. From 1902 until 1911, Class A was the highest level in the minor leagues. In 1912, a new top tier, Class AA, was created; in 1936, a second tier, Class A1, came into being. One year later, the existing Western League disbanded after it ended the 1937 season with only five teams, the Rock Island Islanders, disbanded on July 7. Then, in 1946, the Class AA leagues were renamed AAA, and the A1 loops were renamed AA. Thus the Western League – whose clubs were located in the Great Plains, Rocky Mountain States, the Upper Midwest and the Upper Southwest – was a top-level minor league until 1911, then two levels below Major League Baseball through 1935, and three steps removed in 1936–37 and when it was revived in 1947 during the post-war minor league baseball boom. For several years in the 1910s, the Western League champion played a postseason series against the champion of the Class AA American Association for supremacy of the central states.

== 1947–1958 ==
The Western League reformed in 1947 with six teams: Denver Bears, Des Moines Bruins, Lincoln A's, Omaha Cardinals, Pueblo Dodgers and Sioux City Soos. All six clubs were affiliated with major league farm systems. The WL expanded to eight teams in 1950, adding the Colorado Springs Sky Sox and Wichita Indians, but the encroachment of televised baseball and major league franchise shifts into former AAA cities hit the league hard. In 1955, the Western League's two strongest franchises, the Denver Bears and the Omaha Cardinals, were admitted to the AAA American Association.

The WL continued for four more seasons before folding in the autumn of 1958. Its last champion, the Colorado Springs Sky Sox, attracted only 61,000 fans for the season. In addition to the founding clubs and the Sky Sox, the postwar WL had teams in Albuquerque, Amarillo, Topeka, and Wichita.

== List of teams ==
=== 1900–1958 ===
- Albuquerque Dukes (1956–1958)
- Amarillo Texans (1927-1928); Amarillo Gold Sox (1956–1958)
- Bartlesville Broncs (1933)
- Cedar Rapids Raiders (1934-1937)
- Cheyenne Indians (1941)
- Colorado Springs Millionaires (1901-1905, 1916); Colorado Springs Sky Sox (1950–1958)
- Council Bluffs Rails (1935)
- Davenport Blue Sox (1934-1937)
- Denver Bears (1900); Denver Grizzlies (1901-1912); Denver Bears (1913-1917, 1922-1932), (1941), (1947–1954)
- Des Moines Hawkeyes (1900); Des Moines Millers (1901); Des Moines Midgets (1902); Des Moines Undertakers (1903); Des Moines Prohibitionists (1904); Des Moines Underwriters (1905); Des Moines Champions (1906); Des Moines Champs (1907); Des Moines Boosters (1908-1924); Des Moines Demons (1925-1937), (1947–1958)
- Hutchinson Wheatshockers (1917-1918); Hutchinson Salt Packers (1918), Hutchinson Wheatshockers (1933)
- Joplin Miners (1917-1921, 1933)
- Kansas City Blues (1901); Kansas City Blue Stockings (1902-1903)
- Keokuk Indians (1935)
- Lincoln Ducklings (1906); Lincoln Treeplanters (1907); Lincoln Greenbackers (1908-1909); Lincoln Railsplitters (1910-1912); Lincoln Greenbackers (1913); Lincoln Tigers (1914-1916); Lincoln Links (1917, 1924-1927), (1939); *Lincoln Athletics (1947–1952); Lincoln Chiefs (1953–1958)
- Milwaukee Creams (1902-1903)
- Minneapolis Millers (1901)
- Mitchell Kernels (1939-1940)
- Muskogee Oilers (1933)
- Norfolk Elks (1939); Norfolk Yankees (1940-1941)
- Oklahoma City Indians (1918-1932)
- Omaha Omahogs (1900-1901); Omaha Indians (1902-1903); Omaha Rangers (1904); Omaha Rourkes (1905-1920); Omaha Buffaloes (1921-1927); Omaha Crickets (1928-1929); Omaha Packers (1930-1935); Omaha Robin Hoods (1936); Omaha Cardinals (1947–1954)
- Peoria Distillers (1902-1903)
- Pueblo Indians (1900, 1905-1909, 1911); Pueblo Steelworkers (1928-1929); Pueblo Braves (1930-1932); Pueblo Rollers (1941); Pueblo Dodgers (1947–1958)
- Rock Island Islanders (1934-1935); Rock Island Rocks (1936); Rock Island Islanders (1937)
- St. Paul Saints (1901)
- St. Joseph Saints (1900-1905); St. Joseph Drummers (1910-1917); St. Joseph Saints (1918-1926); St. Joseph Saints (1930-1935)
- Sioux City Cornhuskers (1900); Sioux City Soos (1904); Sioux City Packers (1905-1907); Sioux City Soos (1908-1909); Sioux City Packers (1910-1913); Sioux City Indians (1914-1919); Sioux City Packers (1920-1923); Sioux City Cowboys (1934-1937);Sioux City Soos (1939-1940); Sioux City Cowboys (1941); Sioux City Soos (1947–1958)
- Sioux Falls Canaries (1939-1941, 1946-1953)
- Springfield Cardinals (1933)
- Topeka Jayhawks (1909-1910); Topeka Kaws (1911); Topeka Jayhawks (1912-1915); Topeka Savages (1916); Topeka Kaw-nees (1918); Topeka Jayhawks (1929); Topeka Senators (1930-1934); Topeka Hawks (1956–1958)
- Tulsa Oilers (1919-1929, 1932)
- Waterloo Hawks (1936); Waterloo Reds (1937)
- Wichita Jobbers (1909-1911); Wichita Witches (1912-1917); Wichita Jobbers (1918-1920); (Wichita Witches (1921-1922); Wichita Izzies (1923-1926); Wichita Larks (1927-1928); Wichita Aviators (1929-1932); Wichita Oilers (1933); Wichita Indians (1950–1955)
- Worthington Cardinals (1939-1940)

== 1900 to 1936 standings & statistics ==
=== 1900 ===
The new Western League formed as a Class B league in 1900. Charter teams were the Denver Grizzlies, Des Moines Hawkeyes, Omaha Omahogs, Pueblo Indians, Sioux City Cornhuskers and St. Joseph Saints.

Team Name	Record
Denver Grizzlies	61–44
Des Moines Hawkeyes	54–45
Sioux City Cornhuskers	49–48
Omaha Omahogs	51–53
St. Joseph Saints	51–58
Pueblo Indians	41–64

=== 1901 ===
The teams in Pueblo and Sioux City folded. New teams in Colorado Springs, Colorado, and St. Paul, Minnesota, formed and joined the League. Teams from Kansas City, Missouri, and Minneapolis, Minnesota moved from the American League.

Team Name	Record
Kansas City Blues	79–44
St. Paul Saints	69–54
St. Joseph Saints	69–58
Denver Grizzlies	60–59
Omaha Omahogs	61–62
Minneapolis Millers	56–62
Des Moines Hawkeyes	48–75
Colorado Springs Millionaires	45–73

=== 1902 ===
The Minneapolis and St. Paul teams joined the American Association. New teams in Milwaukee, Wisconsin, and Peoria, Illinois, formed and joined the League.

Team Name	Record
Kansas City Blue Stockings	82–54
Omaha Indians	84–56
Milwaukee Creams	80–54
Denver Grizzlies	81–57
St. Joseph Saints	71–68
Colorado Springs Millionaires	63–75
Des Moines Midgets	54–83
Peoria Distillers	35–103

=== 1903 ===
Team Name	Record
Milwaukee Creams	83–43
Colorado Springs Millionaires	76–52
Kansas City Blue Stockings	65–61
St. Joseph Saints	62–59
Denver Grizzlies	61–70
Peoria Distillers	57–69
Des Moines Undertakers	55–76
Omaha Indians	49–78

=== 1904 ===
The teams in Milwaukee, Kansas City, and Peoria folded. the Sioux City, Iowa team from the Iowa–South Dakota League joined the League.

Team Name	Record
Omaha Packers	90–60
Colorado Springs Millionaires	85–58
Denver Grizzlies	87–61
Des Moines Prohibitionists	76–69
St. Joseph Saints	53–93
Sioux City Soos	45–98

=== 1905 ===
The Colorado Springs team, with a record of 22–48, moved to Pueblo, Colorado on July 15, where they had a record of 30–44.

Team Name	Record
Des Moines Underwriters	95–54
Denver Grizzlies	92–58
Omaha Rourkes	87–62
Sioux City Packers	80–68
Colorado Springs Millionaires/Pueblo Indians	52–92
St. Joseph Saints	37–109

=== 1906 ===
The St. Joseph team moved to the Western Association. A new team in Lincoln, Nebraska, formed and joined the League.

Team Name	Record
Des Moines Champions	97–50
Lincoln Ducklings	75–74
Omaha Rourkes	73–74
Sioux City Packers	69–81
Denver Grizzlies	68–81
Pueblo Indians	63–85

=== 1907 ===
Team Name	Record
Omaha Rourkes	84–63
Lincoln Treeplanters	79–63
Des Moines Champs	76–63
Denver Grizzlies	67–75
Pueblo Indians	65–73
Sioux City Packers	56–90

=== 1908 ===
Team Name	Record
Sioux City Soos	88–57
Omaha Rourkes	86–59
Lincoln Greenbackers	74–73
Denver Grizzlies	71–75
Pueblo Indians	63–78
Des Moines Boosters	54–94

=== 1909 ===
Teams from Topeka, Kansas, and Wichita, Kansas, joined from the Western Association.

Team Name	Record
Des Moines Boosters	93–59
Sioux City Soos	94–60
Omaha Rourkes	84–68
Topeka Jayhawks	76–73
Wichita Jobbers	71-82
Denver Grizzlies	69–82
Lincoln Greenbackers	61–89
Pueblo Indians	58–93

=== 1910 ===
The Pueblo team folded. A new team in St. Joseph, Missouri, formed and joined the League.

Team Name	Record
Sioux City Packers	108–60
Denver Grizzlies	102–65
Lincoln Railsplitters	95–71
Wichita Jobbers	89–78
Omaha Rourkes	84–82
St. Joseph Drummers	76–91
Des Moines Boosters	72–96
Topeka Jayhawks	42–125

=== 1911 ===
The Wichita team, with a record of 15–9, moved to Pueblo, Colorado on May 22, Their record there was 77–66.

Team Name	Record
Denver Grizzlies	111–54
St. Joseph Drummers	93–72
Wichita Jobbers/Pueblo Indians	92–75
Omaha Rourkes	85–80
Sioux City Packers	85–80
Lincoln Railsplitters	84–81
Topeka Kaws	60–104
Des Moines Boosters	49–113

=== 1912 ===
The Pueblo team moved back to Wichita, Kansas.

Team Name	Record
Denver Grizzlies	99–63
St. Joseph Drummers	94–72
Omaha Rourkes	92–71
Des Moines Boosters	82–80
Lincoln Railsplitters	83–81
Sioux City Packers	74–85
Wichita Jobbers	75–89
Topeka Jayhawks	51–109

Denver defeated the Minneapolis team of the American Association 4 games to 1.

=== 1913 ===
Team Name	Record
Denver Bears	104–62
Des Moines Boosters	93–72
St. Joseph Drummers	89–78
Lincoln Greenbackers	87–80
Omaha Rourkes	79–86
Sioux City Packers	73–92
Topeka Jayhawks	73–92
Wichita Jobbers	65–101

Milwaukee of the American Association defeated Denver 4 games to 2.

=== 1914 ===
Wichita Jobbers renamed Wichita Wolves.

Team Name	Record
Sioux City Indians	105–60
Denver Bears	96–72
St. Joseph Drummers	89–75
Des Moines Boosters	82–81
Lincoln Tigers	81–87
Omaha Rourkes	77–87
Topeka Jayhawks	68–97
Wichita Wolves	63–102

Indianapolis of the American Association defeated Denver 4 games to 2.

=== 1915 ===
Team Name	Record
Des Moines Boosters	87–53
Denver Bears	82–55
Topeka Jayhawks	75–63
Omaha Rourkes	71–69
Lincoln Tigers	70–69
Sioux City Packers	66–68
Wichita Wolves	57–80
St. Joseph Drummers	43–94

=== 1916 ===
The Wichita team, with a record of 58–84, moved to Colorado Springs, Colorado on September 10. Their record there was 2–10.

Team Name	Record
Omaha Rourkes	92–57
Lincoln Tigers	87–63
Sioux City Indians	79–71
Denver Bears	78–75
Des Moines Boosters	75–75
Topeka Savages	67–86
Wichita Wolves/Colorado Springs Millionaires	57–94

Louisville of the American Association defeated Omaha 4 games to 1.

=== 1917 ===
The Topeka team folded. A new team in Joplin, Missouri formed and joined the League. Colorado Springs moved back to Wichita. St. Joseph, with a record of 34–56, moved to Hutchinson, where their record was 32–24, on July 24. Sioux City moved to St. Joseph on August 5.

Team Name	Record
Des Moines Boosters	84–62 (1st half winner)
Lincoln Links	83–64
Sioux City Indians/St. Joseph Drummers	80–66
Joplin Miners	79–68
Omaha Rourkes	73–75
St. Joseph Drummers/Hutchinson Wheatshockers	66–80
Denver Bears	62–86
Wichita Wolves	61–87

Hutchinson defeated Joplin 3 games to none for the second half title. Des Moines defeated Hutchinson 4 games to 2 for the championship.

=== 1918 ===
The Denver and Lincoln teams folded. New teams in Sioux City, Iowa, and Topeka, Kansas, formed and joined the League. Hutchinson, with a record of 14–19, moved to Oklahoma City, Oklahoma on June 2, where they compiled a record of 19–18. Topeka, with a record of 19–13, moved to Hutchinson, Kansas, where they compiled a record of 18–18, on June 2. The League suspended operations on July 7 due to World War I.

Team Name	Record
Wichita Jobbers	41–24
Topeka Kaw-nees / Hutchinson Salt Packers	37–31
Des Moines Boosters	36–31
Joplin Miners	34–31
Omaha Rourkes	33–32
Hutchinson Salt Packers / Oklahoma City Oklahomans	
St. Joseph Saints	30–38
Sioux City Indians	22–42

=== 1919 ===
The Hutchinson team folded. A new team was formed in Tulsa, Oklahoma, and joined the League.

Team Name	Record
St. Joseph Saints	78–57
Tulsa Oilers	77–63
Wichita Jobbers	75–65
Des Moines Boosters	71–67
Oklahoma City Indians	69–69
Sioux City Indians	68–72
Joplin Miners	57–78
Omaha Rourkes	56–80

Tulsa lead St. Joseph 3 games to 1 in the championship series when the series was cancelled due to bad weather.

Wichita's Joe Wilhoit had a 69-game hitting streak, which remains the professional baseball record.

=== 1920 ===
Team Name	Record
Tulsa Oilers	92–61
Wichita Jobbers	92–62
Oklahoma City Indians	82–68
Omaha Rourkes	76–77
St. Joseph Saints	74–80
Joplin Miners	73–81
Sioux City Packers	63–88
Des Moines Boosters	58–93

=== 1921 ===
Team Name	Record
Wichita Witches	106–61
Omaha Buffaloes	95–73
Oklahoma City Indians	93–75
Sioux City Packers	81–83
St. Joseph Saints	79–88
Joplin Miners	76–91
Des Moines Boosters	71–92
Tulsa Oilers	65–103

=== 1922 ===
Joplin moved to the Western Association. A new team formed in Denver, Colorado, and joined the League.

Team Name	Record
Tulsa Oilers	103–64
St. Joseph Saints	98–70
Wichita Wolves	94–73
Omaha Buffaloes	91–77
Sioux City Packers	86–79
Oklahoma City Indians	73–94
Denver Bears	63–105
Des Moines Boosters	61–107

Tulsa beat Mobile of the Southern Association 4 games to 1, with 1 tie

=== 1923 ===
Team Name	Record
Oklahoma City Indians	102–64
Tulsa Oilers	101–67
Wichita Izzies	100–68
Omaha Buffaloes	92–74
Des Moines Boosters	87–79
St. Joseph Saints	65–101
Sioux City Packers	59–105
Denver Bears	59–107

=== 1924 ===
Sioux City moved to the Tri-State League. Lincoln joined from the Nebraska State League.

Team Name	Record
Omaha Buffaloes	103–61
Denver Bears	100–67
Tulsa Oilers	98–69
St. Joseph Saints	86–79
Oklahoma City Indians	82–86
Wichita Izzies	79–88
Des Moines Boosters	59–106
Lincoln Links	57–108

=== 1925 ===
Team Name	Record
Des Moines Demons	98–70
Denver Bears	97–71
Oklahoma City Indians	88–76
Wichita Izzies	80–84
St. Joseph Saints	77–87
Omaha Buffaloes	74–89
Tulsa Oilers	75–91
Lincoln Links	70–91

=== 1926 ===
Team Name	Record
Des Moines Demons	99–64
Oklahoma City Indians	100–66
St. Joseph Saints	89–75
Tulsa Oilers	86–78
Denver Bears	88–80
Omaha Buffaloes	77–89
Lincoln Links	64–101
Wichita Izzies	58–108

Springfield of the Three-I League led Des Moines 3 games to 1 when the series was cancelled due to bad weather.

=== 1927 ===
St. Joseph moved to the Western Association. A new team in Amarillo, Texas formed and joined.

Team Name	Record
Tulsa Oilers	101–53
Wichita Larks	91–63
Des Moines Demons	82–72
Denver Bears	77–75
Oklahoma City Indians	68–86
Amarillo Texans	66–87
Omaha Buffaloes	66–88
Lincoln Links	63–90

Waco of the Texas League beat Tulsa 3 games to 2, with 1 tie.

=== 1928 ===
Lincoln moved to the Nebraska State League. A new team in Pueblo, Colorado, formed and joined the League.

Team Name	Record
Oklahoma City Indians	95–67 (1st half winner)
Tulsa Oilers	96–69 (2nd half winner)
Wichita Larks	94–70
Pueblo Steelworkers	85–78
Denver Bears	81–84
Omaha Crickets	71-86
Amarillo Texans	60–93
Des Moines Demons	63–98

Tulsa beat Oklahoma City 4 games to 1, with 1 tie, for the championship.

=== 1929 ===
Amarillo folded. The Topeka, Kansas team from the Western Association joined.

Team Name	Record
Tulsa Oilers	95–66
Oklahoma City Indians	85–68
Omaha Crickets	81–75
Wichita Aviators	77–79
Denver Bears	73–81
Topeka Jayhawks	75–85
Des Moines Demons	72–86
Pueblo Steelworkers	69–90

=== 1930 ===
The Tulsa team folded. A new team formed in St. Joseph, Missouri and joined the League.

Team Name	Record
Wichita Aviators	89–56
Omaha Packers	76–66
Oklahoma City Indians	79–71
Des Moines Demons	77–71
Pueblo Braves	75–75
Denver Bears	74–74
Topeka Senators	66–84
St. Joseph Saints	53–92

=== 1931 ===
Team Name	Record
Des Moines Demons	94–51 (2nd half winner)
Wichita Aviators	92–58 (1st half winner)
St. Joseph Saints	79–64
Pueblo Braves	76–69
Oklahoma City Indians	70–80
Denver Bears	64–77
Topeka Senators	58–86
Omaha Packers	49–97

Des Moines Demons beat Wichita 4 games to 2 for the championship.

=== 1932 ===
Topeka moved to the Western Association. The Tulsa team joined.

Team Name	Affiliation	Record
Tulsa Oilers	Pittsburgh Pirates	98–48 (1st half winner)
Denver Bears	St. Louis Cardinals	83–64
Oklahoma City Indians		83–67 (2nd half winner)
Des Moines Demons		71–72
St. Joseph Saints		72–75
Wichita Aviators	Chicago Cubs	63–86
Pueblo Braves		62–90
Omaha Packers		58–88

Oklahoma City beat Tulsa 2 games to 1 for the second half title. Tulsa beat Oklahoma City 4 games to none for the championship.

=== 1933 ===
Denver & Pueblo folded. Oklahoma City and Tulsa moved to the Texas League. The teams from Hutchinson, Kansas and Springfield, Missouri joined from the American Association. New teams in Joplin, Missouri, and Topeka, Kansas, formed and joined the League. Wichita, with a record of 6–13, moved to Muskogee on June 6, keeping the Oilers name, where they had a record of 20–82. Hutchinson, with a record of 25–32, moved on July 7 to Bartlesville, where they had a record of 26–38.

Team Name	Affiliation	Record
Des Moines Demons		81–47
St. Joseph Saints		77–47 (1st half winner)
Springfield Cardinals	St. Louis Cardinals	73–50
Topeka Senators	Cincinnati Reds	68–55 (2nd half winner)
Omaha Packers		63–61
Joplin Miners	St. Louis Browns	55–69
Hutchinson Wheatshockers / Bartlesville Broncs	Detroit Tigers	51–70
Wichita Oilers/Muskogee Oilers		26–95

St. Joseph beat Topeka 4 games to 1. St. Joseph lost to the Davenport Blue Sox from the Mississippi Valley League 4 games to 2.

=== 1934 ===
Bartlesville, Joplin, Muskogee, and Springfield moved to the Western Association. The teams from Davenport Blue Sox, and Rock Island Islanders joined from the Mississippi Valley League. New teams in Cedar Rapids, Iowa, and Sioux City, Iowa formed and joined the League.

Team Name	Affiliation	Record
Sioux City Cowboys		74–50 (1st half title tie)
Davenport Blue Sox		70–53 (2nd half winner)
Des Moines Demons		68–56 (1st half title tie)
St. Joseph Saints		65–56 (1st half title tie)
Topeka Senators	Cincinnati Reds	59–64
Rock Island Islanders		58–65
Omaha Packers		49–73
Cedar Rapids Raiders		47–73

St. Joseph beat Sioux City 3 games to 1 in the first round of playoffs. Davenport beat Des Moines by the same number. In the championship, St. Joseph beat Davenport 4 games to 3.

=== 1935 ===
Topeka folded. A new team in Keokuk, Iowa formed and joined the League. Omaha, with a record of 22–15, moved to Council Bluffs, Iowa on June 25, where they had a record of 33–31. Rock Island folded July 17. Council Bluffs folded August 27.

Team Name	Affiliation	Record
Davenport Blue Sox		70–46
St. Joseph Saints		58–48
Des Moines Demons		58–55
Sioux City Cowboys		54–52
Cedar Rapids Raiders		53–57
Keokuk Indians		49–66
Omaha Packers / Council Bluffs Rails		55–46
Rock Island Islanders		19–46

Sioux City beat Davenport 3 games to none, and St. Joseph beat Des Moines 3 games to none, in the first round of the playoffs. St. Joseph beat Sioux City 4 games to 3 for the championship.

=== 1936 ===
Keokuk and St. Joseph folded. New teams formed in Omaha, Nebraska, and Waterloo, Iowa, and joined the League. Omaha moved to Rock Island on August 18.

Team Name	Affiliation	Record
Davenport Blue Sox	Brooklyn Dodgers	74–52 (1st & 2nd half winner)
Cedar Rapids Raiders	St. Louis Cardinals	70–58
Des Moines Raiders (Iowans)		64–64
Omaha Robin Hoods / Rock Island Islanders		62–64
Sioux City Cowboys		61–64
Waterloo Hawks		50–79

=== 1937 ===
Rock Island folded July 7.

Team Name	Affiliation	Record
Cedar Rapids Raiders	St. Louis Cardinals	78–38 (1st & 2nd half winner)
Waterloo Reds		61–55
Davenport Blue Sox	Brooklyn Dodgers	57–59
Des Moines Iowans	St. Louis Browns	57–62
Sioux City Cowboys	Detroit Tigers	50–63
Rock Island Islanders		20–46

Cedar Rapids and Waterloo moved to the Three-I League. Sioux City moved to the Nebraska State League. Davenport, Des Moines, and the League itself folded.

== 1939 to 1941 standings & statistics ==
1939 Western League

Team standings	W	L	PCT	GB	Managers
Norfolk Elks	75	44	.630	-	Doc Bennett
Sioux Falls Canaries	66	52	.559	8½	Ralph Brandon
Sioux City Soos	63	52	.548	10	Pete Monahan
Lincoln Links	64	55	.538	11	Pug Griffin
Mitchell Kernels	49	69	.415	25½	Red Davis (8/1) / Charles Moglia
Worthington Cardinals	36	81	.308	38½	Joe McDermott

Playoffs: Sioux City 3 games, Norfolk 2; Lincoln 3 games, Sioux Falls 2
Finals: Sioux City 4 games, Lincoln 2.

Player statistics
Player	Team	Stat	Tot	Player	Team	Stat	Tot
Howard Conners	Sioux Falls	BA	.365	Ox Miller	Lincoln	W	21
Wendell Finders	Norfolk	Hits	167	Ox Miller	Lincoln	SO	208
Bob Dillinger	Lincoln	Runs	139	Lawrence Kempe	Sioux Falls	ERA	3.02
Ted Kakaloris	Lincoln	RBI	114	Leonard Bobeck	Norfolk	PCT	.864 19-3
William Morgan	Norfolk	HR	17				

1940 Western League

Team standings	W	L	PCT	GB	Managers
Norfolk Yankees	73	39	.652	-	Doc Bennett
Sioux Falls Canaries	59	58	.504	16½	Robert Fenner
Worthington Cardinals	50	59	.459	21½	Ray Martin / George Payne
Sioux City Soos / Mitchell Kernels	44	70	.386	30	Jimmy Zinn / Ed Grayston

Sioux City moved to Mitchell July 24.
The league played four quarters. Norfolk won the first, second and fourth quarters, while Sioux Falls won the third quarter.
Playoff: Sioux Falls 4 games, Norfolk 2.

Player statistics
Player	Team	Stat	Tot	Player	Team	Stat	Tot
Johnny Lucas	Worthington	BA	.356	Frank Wagner	Sioux Falls	W	17
Leo Bohanan	Sioux Falls	Hits	158	Frank Wagner	Sioux Falls	SO	193
Robert Duby	Norfolk	Runs	112	Fred Whalen	Norfolk	ERA	1.36
Fred Schenk	Norfolk	RBI	97	Fred Whalen	Norfolk	PCT	.786 11-3
Russell Burns	Norfolk	HR	17				

1941 Western League

Team standings	W	L	PCT	GB	Managers
Norfolk Yankees	64	44	.593	-	Ray Powell
Cheyenne Indians	59	44	.573	2½	John Kerr
Sioux City Cowboys	54	56	.491	11	Richard Tichacek
Pueblo Rollers	52	54	.491	11	Pug Griffin
Sioux Falls Canaries	51	56	.477	12½	Robert Fenner / Tony Koenig
Denver Bears	42	68	.382	23	Cobe Jones

Playoffs: Norfolk 3 games, Sioux City 2; Pueblo 3 games, Cheyenne 1
Finals: Pueblo 3 games, Norfolk 2.

Player statistics
Player	Team	Stat	Tot	Player	Team	Stat	Tot
Bernard Steele	Pueblo	BA	.383	George Milstead	Cheyenne	W	19
Bernard Steele	Pueblo	Hits	158	Robert Bergen	Pueblo	SO	183
Bernard Steele	Pueblo	Runs	88	Frank Wagner	Sioux Falls	ERA	2.15
Frank Bocek	Norfolk	RBI	92	George Milstead	Cheyenne	PCT	.792 19-5
Mel Bergman	Cheyenne	HR	10				

The League did not operate from 1942 to 1946. It returned in 1947 and regained its Class A Status.

== 1947 to 1958 standings & statistics ==
1947 Western League

Team standings	W	L	PCT	GB	Attend	Managers
Sioux City Soos	81	49	.623	-	113,036	Joe Becker
Des Moines Bruins	72	52	.591	½	152,027	Jim Keesey
Pueblo Dodgers	70	58	.547	10	80,163	Walter Alston
Omaha Cardinals	67	62	.519	13½	138,308	Ollie Vanek
Denver Bears	54	75	.419	26½	124,923	Marty McManus
Lincoln Athletics	38	89	.299	41½	43,464	Ham Schulte / Tom Oliver

Playoffs: Sioux City 3 games, Omaha 1; Pueblo 3 games, Des Moines 1
Finals: Pueblo 4 games, Sioux City 1.

Player statistics
Player	Team	Stat	Tot	Player	Team	Stat	Tot
Edmund Lewinski	Omaha	BA	.346	Red Webb	Sioux City	W	19-7
Michael Conroy	Omaha	Hits	190	Charlie Bishop	Omaha	SO	133
Preston Ward	Pueblo	Runs	120	Herb Chmiel	Des Moines	ERA	2.23
Preston Ward	Pueblo	RBI	121	Herb Chmiel	Des Moines	PCT	.778 14-4
Tony Jaros	Sioux City	HR	24				

1948 Western League

Team standings	W	L	PCT	GB	Attend	Managers
Des Moines Bruins	76	64	.543	-	232,038	Stan Hack
Denver Bears	70	67	.511	4½	283,377	Mike Gazella
Lincoln Athletics	69	68	.504	5½	127,462	Jimmie DeShong
Sioux City Soos	69	68	.504	5½	112,381	Joe Becker
Pueblo Dodgers	69	70	.496	6½	116,304	John Fitzpatrick
Omaha Cardinals	62	78	.443	14	147,130	Ollie Vanek

Playoffs: Lincoln 3 games, Des Moines 2; Sioux City 3 games, Denver 2. Lincoln defeated Sioux City 6-0 for third place.
Finals: Sioux City 4 games, Lincoln 2.

Player statistics
Player	Team	Stat	Tot	Player	Team	Stat	Tot
Red Treadway	Des Moines	BA	.352	Bobby Shantz	Lincoln	W	18-7
George Genovese	Denver	Runs	119	Bobby Shantz	Lincoln	SO	212
Nellie Fox	Lincoln	Hits	179	Tony Jacobs	Des Moines	ERA	2.72
Tookie Gilbert	Sioux City	RBI	114	Turk Lown	Pueblo	PCT	.739 17-6
Carl Sawatski	Des Moines	HR	29				

1949 Western League

Team standings	W	L	PCT	GB	Attend	Managers
Lincoln Athletics	74	64	.536	-	149,159	Jimmie DeShong
Denver Bears	71	68	.511	3½	463,039	Mike Gazella / Bill DeCarlo / Earle Browne
Pueblo Dodgers	71	68	.511	3½	138,726	Ray Hathaway
Des Moines Bruins	70	70	.500	5½	210,204	Stan Hack
Omaha Cardinals	68	71	.489	6½	277,370	Cedric Durst
Sioux City Soos	63	76	.453	11½	125,356	Don Ramsay

Playoffs: Denver defeated Pueblo 5-3 for second place. Des Moines 3 games, Lincoln 1; Pueblo 3 games, Denver 1
Finals: Pueblo 4 games, Des Moines 3.

Player statistics
Player	Team	Stat	Tot	Player	Team	Stat	Tot
Victor Marasco	Pueblo	BA	.330	Earl Stabelfeld	Des Moines	W	17
Jim Williams	Pueblo	Runs	126	Lynn Lovenguth	Des Moines	W	17
Fred Richards	Des Moines	Hits	178	Walter Cox	Sioux City	W	17
Lou Limmer	Lincoln	HR	29	George Uhle	Denver	ERA	2.25

1950 Western League

Team standings	W	L	PCT	GB	Attend	Managers
Omaha Cardinals	96	58	.623	-	218,393	Al Hollingsworth
Sioux City Soos	89	65	.578	3½	463,039	Hugh Poland
Des Moines Bruins	84	70	.545	12	147,549	Charlie Root
Wichita Indians	77	77	.500	19	126,729	Joe Schultz
Denver Bears	75	79	.487	21	379,180	Earl Browne
Colorado Springs Sky Sox	72	82	.468	24	107,264	Buddy Hassett
Lincoln Athletics	69	85	.448	27	68,884	Jimmie DeShong
Pueblo Dodgers	54	100	.351	42	91,299	Ray Hathaway

Playoffs: Wichita 3 games, Omaha 0; Sioux City 3 games, Des Moines 2
Finals: Sioux City 3 games, Wichita 1.

Player statistics
Player	Team	Stat	Tot	Player	Team	Stat	Tot
Bill Taylor	Sioux City	BA	.346	Bob Mahoney	Omaha	W	20
Danny Holden	Denver	Runs	131	Bob Mahoney	Omaha	SO	162
Chuck Tanner	Denver	Hits	195	Vern Fear	Des Moines	ERA	2.83
Pete Whisenant	Denver	RBI	119	Vern Fear	Des Moines	PCT	.750 15-5
Pat Seerey	Colorado Springs	HR	44				

1951 Western League

Team standings	W	L	PCT	GB	Attend	Managers
Omaha Cardinals	90	64	.584	-	162,247	George Kissell
Denver Bears	88	66	.571	2	424,065	Andy Cohen
Wichita Indians	84	68	.553	5	122,060	Joe Schultz
Sioux City Soos	77	71	.520	10	104,247	Frank Genovese
Des Moines Bruins	73	78	.483	15½	94,137	Al Todd
Pueblo Dodgers	74	80	.481	16½	104,254	Jim Biven
Colorado Springs Sky Sox	64	87	.424	24½	107,320	Skeeter Webb / Otto Denning
Lincoln Athletics	57	93	.380	31½	37,123	Frank Skaff

Playoffs: Sioux City 3 games, Omaha 1; Denver 3 games, Wichita 1
Finals: Sioux City 3 games, Denver 1.

Player statistics
Player	Team	Stat	Tot	Player	Team	Stat	Tot
George Freese	Pueblo	BA	.338	Elroy Face	Pueblo	W	23
Ron Samford	Sioux	Runs	108	Willard Schmidt	Omaha	SO	202
George Freese	Pueblo	Hits	183	Willard Schmidt	Omaha	ERA	2.11
George Freese	Pueblo	RBI	106	Ray Peters	Wichita	PCT	.800 12-3
Howie Boles	Des Moines / Denver	HR	32				

1952 Western League'

Team standings	W	L	PCT	GB	Attend	Managers
Denver Bears	88	66	.571	-	461,419	Andy Cohen
Colorado Springs Sky Sox	87	67	.565	1	170,041	Don Gutteridge
Omaha Cardinals	86	68	.558	2	137,378	George Kissell
Sioux City Soos	83	71	.539	5	103,004	Ray Mueller
Pueblo Dodgers	81	73	.526	7	122,746	Bill McCahan
Wichita Indians	67	87	.435	21	116,703	Ralph Winegarner
Lincoln Athletics	67	87	.435	21	61,483	Les Bell
Des Moines Bruins	57	97	.370	31	62,597	Harry Strohm

Playoffs: Denver 3 games, Sioux City 1; Omaha 3 games, Colorado Springs 1
Finals: Denver 3 games, Omaha 0.

Player statistics
Player	Team	Stat	Tot	Player	Team	Stat	Tot
Ed Phillips	Omaha	BA	.320	Alberto Osorio	Denver	W	20
Ken Landenberger	Colorado Springs	Runs	112	Connie Johnson	Colorado Springs	SO	233
Ken Landenberger	Colorado Springs	Hits	183	Jim Singleton	Sioux City	ERA	2.73
Ken Landenberger	Colorado Springs	RBI	133	Lou Ciola	Omaha	PCT	.938 15-1
Bill Pinckard	Denver	HR	35				

1953 Western League

Team standings	W	L	PCT	GB	Attend	Managers
Colorado Springs Sky Sox	95	69	.617	-	141,117	Don Gutteridge
Denver Bears	94	60	.610	1	322,128	Andy Cohen
Pueblo Dodgers	78	77	.503	17½	103,878	George Pfister
Des Moines Bruins	77	78	497	18½	98,972	Kemp Wicker / Bruce Edwards
Omaha Cardinals	74	80	.481	21	115,512	George Kissell
Lincoln Chiefs	71	83	.461	24	87,615	Lou Finney / Walt Linden
Sioux City Soos	70	84	.455	25	45,412	Ray Mueller
Wichita Indians	58	96	.377	37	68,683	George Hausmann / Mark Christman

Playoffs: Des Moines 3 games, Colorado Springs 1; Denver 3 games, Pueblo 0
Finals: Des Moines 3 games, Denver 1.

Player statistics
Player	Team	Stat	Tot	Player	Team	Stat	Tot
Kent Pflasterer	Pueblo	BA	.350	Norman Brown	Lincoln	W	21
Len Johnston	Colorado Springs	Runs	133	Karl Spooner	Pueblo	SO	198
Glen Gorbous	Pueblo	Hits	204	Walt Montgomery	Omaha	ERA	2.43
Jerry Crosby	Colorado Springs	RBI	115	Jake Thies	Denver	ERA	2.43
Jim Gentile	Pueblo	HR	34	Nellie King	Denver	PCT	.833 15-3

1954 Western League

Team standings	W	L	PCT	GB	Attend	Managers
Denver Bears	94	56	.627	-	232,686	Andy Cohen
Des Moines Bruins	88	66	.571	8	113,691	Les Peden
Omaha Cardinals	83	68	.550	11½	150,131	Ferrell Anderson
Pueblo Dodgers	79	74	.516	16½	80,768	Goldie Holt
Sioux City Soos	78	75	.510	17½	69,333	Dave Garcia
Wichita Indians	76	77	.497	19½	87,854	Herb Brett /Les Layton
Lincoln Chiefs	62	88	.413	32	80,660	Whitey Wietelmann / Glenn McQuillen
Colorado Springs Sky Sox	48	104	.316	47	59,606	Mickey Livingston / Bud Stewart / Al Jacinto

Playoffs: Denver 3 games, Pueblo 1; Des Moines 3 games, Omaha 1
Finals: Des Moines 3 games, Denver 1.

Player statistics
Player	Team	Stat	Tot	Player	Team	Stat	Tot
Joe Kirrene	Colorado Springs	BA	.343	Bob Clear	Omaha	W	20-11
Bobby Prescott	Denver	Runs	137	Bob Garber	Denver	SO	173
Reno DeBenedetti	Denver	Hits	183	Hy Cohen	Des Moines	ERA	1.88
Bill White	Sioux City	Hits	183	Clarence Churn	Denver	PCT	.786 11-3
Rocco Ippolito	Denver	RBI	131				
Bill White	Sioux City	HR	30				
Bill White	Sioux City	SB	40				

1955 Western League

Team standings	W	L	PCT	GB	Attend	Managers
Colorado Springs Sky Sox	81	69	.540	-	87,527	Jack Conway
Pueblo Dodgers	79	71	.527	2	73,941	Goldie Holt
Wichita Indians	78	73	.517	3½	94,862	Bud Bates
Des Moines Bruins	77	74	.510	4½	88,181	Les Peden / Pepper Martin
Sioux City Soos	69	81	.460	12	62,902	John Davenport
Lincoln Chiefs	67	83	.447	14	90,024	Bill Burwell

Playoffs: Des Moines 3 games, Colorado Springs 1; Wichita 3 games, Pueblo 2. Wichita defeated Des Moines in a one-game playoff for third place.
Finals: Wichita 3 games, Des Moines 0.

Player statistics
Player	Team	Stat	Tot	Player	Team	Stat	Tot
Sammy Hairston	Colorado Springs	BA	.350	Joe Stanka	Des Moines	W	17
Willie Kirkland	Sioux City	Runs	117	Bob Harrison	Wichita	SO	270
Clarence Moore	Pueblo	Hits	194	Dick Hall	Lincoln	ERA	2.24
Ron Cooper	Colorado Springs	RBI	117	Dick Hall	Lincoln	PCT	.706 12-5
Willie Kirkland	Sioux City	HR	40				

1956 Western League

Team standings	W	L	PCT	GB	Attend	Managers
Amarillo Gold Sox	87	52	.626	-	77,628	Chuck Stevens
Lincoln Chiefs	84	54	.609	2½	92,554	Larry Shepard
Des Moines Bruins	72	67	.518	15	67,973	Lou Klein
Topeka Hawks	70	68	.507	16½	103,938	Bud Bates
Pueblo Dodgers	68	70	.493	18½	51,496	Ray Hathaway
Colorado Springs Sky Sox	66	72	.478	20½	59,282	Jack Conway
Albuquerque Dukes	59	81	.421	28½	94,176	Bob Swift
Sioux City Soos	49	91	.350	38½	40,734	Hal Olt / Bob Clear

Playoff: Lincoln 4 games, Amarillo 1.

Player statistics
Player	Team	Stat	Tot	Player	Team	Stat	Tot
Art Cuitti	Amarillo	BA	.364	Marshall Bridges	Topeka	W	18
Art Cuitti	Amarillo	Runs	132	Marshall Bridges	Topeka	SO	213
Lynn Van de Hey	Albuquerque	Hits	197	John O'Donnell	Topeka	ERA	3.32
Dick Stuart	Lincoln	RBI	158	Bennie Daniels	Lincoln	PCT	.833 15-3
Dick Stuart	Lincoln	HR	66				

1957 Western League

Team standings	W	L	PCT	GB	Attend	Managers
Lincoln Chiefs	98	56	.636	-	100,190	Larry Shepard
Amarillo Gold Sox	97	57	.630	1	102,210	Eddie Bockman
Topeka Hawks	87	64	.576	9½	88, 014	Red Smith / Bill Dossey
Sioux City Soos	71	82	.464	26½	46,851	Ken Landenberger
Colorado Springs Sky Sox	68	86	.442	30½	45,184	Ira Hutchinson
Albuquerque Dukes	66	88	.429	32	92,236	Nick Cullop / Hal Toso
Pueblo Dodgers	66	88	.429	32	40,887	Ray Hathaway
Des Moines Demons	60	92	.395	37	79,965	Lou Stringer / Hersh Martin

No Playoffs held.

Player statistics
Player	Team	Stat	Tot	Player	Team	Stat	Tot
Sammy Miley	Lincoln	BA	.374	John Stadnicki	Topeka	W	23
Ray Webster	Amarillo	Runs	136	Dave Stenhouse	Des Moines	SO	184
Chuck Coles	Albuquerque	Hits	208	Hugh Blanton	Amarillo	ERA	2.86
Al Pinkston	Amarillo	RBI	133	John Stadnicki	Topeka	PCT	.793 23-6
Leonard Williams	Topeka	HR	43				

1958 Western League

Teamstandings	W	L	PCT	GB	Attend	Managers
Colorado Springs Sky Sox	87	60	.592	-	61,091	Skeeter Scalzi
Amarillo Gold Sox	84	63	.571	3	85,931	Eddie Bockman / Gale Pringle
Lincoln Chiefs	75	71	.514	11½	67,604	Monty Basgall
Pueblo Dodgers	73	74	.497	14	39,179	Ray Mueller
Albuquerque Dukes	71	75	.486	15½	81,702	Jimmy Brown
Sioux City Soos	69	77	.473	17½	55,921	Rocky Tedesco / Ted Shandor
Topeka Hawks	65	82	.442	22	43,686	George McQuinn
Des Moines Bruins	61	83	.424	24½	35,039	Roy Hartsfield

No Playoffs held.

Player statistics
Player	Team	Stat	Tot	Player	Team	Stat	Tot
Jim McAnany	Colorado Springs	BA	.400	Hugh Blanton	Amarillo	W	20
Stan Johnson	Colorado Springs	Runs	120	Pedro Carrillo	Albuquerque	SO	177
Stan Johnson	Colorado Springs	Hits	204	Hal DeMars	Topeka	SO	177
Al Pinkston	Amarillo	Hits	204	Al Jackson	Lincoln	ERA	2.07
Al Pinkston	Amarillo	RBI	126	Gale Pringle	Amarillo	PCT	.824 14-3
Daniel Lynk	Sioux City	HR	37				

== Media ==
The Western League was the topic of the book The Western League: A Baseball History, 1885 through 1999 (2002, McFarland Publishing) by W. C. Madden & Patrick J. Stewart. The ISBN 0786410035.
