= Sioux City Packers =

- 1884–1973; (1884, 1907–1932, 1946–1956, 1960–1973); Sioux City, Iowa

Minor league affiliations
- Previous classes: Single-A, Class D, Class B
- Previous leagues: Western League (1960–1973): Three-I League (1911-1932, 1946–1956); Central Association (1908–1910); Iowa State League (1907); Iowa-South Dakota League (1902–1903); Western Association (1884)

Major league affiliations
- Previous teams: New York Giants (1947-1955); St. Louis Cardinals (1956, 1941); Kansas City A's (1959–1960); Detroit Tigers (1937, 1939)

Team data
- Name: Sioux City Soos (1947–1958; 1940–1941; 1903–1904); Sioux City Cowboys (1934–1939); Sioux City Cardinals (1924); Sioux City Packers (1920–1923; 1905–1913); Sioux City Indians (1914–1919); Sioux City Cornuskers (1894, 1900, 1902); Sioux City Corn Huskers (1888–1891)
- Ballpark: Evans Park

The Sioux City Packers was the primary name of the minor league baseball team based in Sioux City, Iowa. Sioux City teams played in various minor league seasons between 1888 and 1960.

== History ==
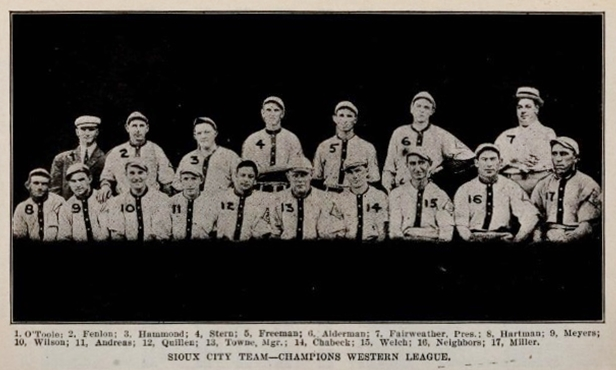
The 1910 Sioux City Packers

Sioux City has a long professional baseball history. The team was known as the Sioux City Soos (1947-1958; 1940-1941; 1903-1904), Sioux City Cowboys (1934-1939), Sioux City Cardinals (1924), Sioux City Packers (1920-1923; 1905-1913), Sioux City Indians (1914-1919), Sioux City Cornhuskers (1894, 1900, 1902) and the Sioux City Huskers (1888-1891).

Sioux City teams played as members of the Western League (1960–1973), Three-I League (1911-1932, 1946-1956), Central Association (1908-1910), Iowa State League (1907) and the Western Association (1884).

Sioux City was a minor league affiliate of the New York Giants (1947-1955), St. Louis Cardinals (1941, 1956), Kansas City A's (1959-1960) and the Detroit Tigers (1937, 1939).

Sioux City teams hosted home minor league games at Evans Park

Baseball Hall of Fame members Jim Bottomley (1920) and Dave Bancroft (1936) played for Sioux City teams.

== Notable alumni ==
- Dave Bancroft (1936) Inducted Baseball Hall of Fame, 1971
- Jim Bottomley (1920) Inducted Baseball Hall of Fame, 1974
- Norm Bass (1960) Played in NFL and MLB. Paralympic Games medalist.
- George Bradley (1889) 1876 NL ERA Leader
- Eddie Bressoud (1951-1952) MLB All-Star
- George Burns (1913) 1926 AL Most Valuable Player
- Bert Cunningham (1894)
- Dave Garcia (1947, 1954)
- Billy Gardner (1950)
- Jack Glasscock (1900) 1890 NL Batting Title
- Danny Green (1908-1909)
- Ducky Holmes (1908-1909, 1912-1913, 1918)
- Dick Howser (1959-1960) 2x MLB All-Star; Manager: 1985 World Series Champion - Kansas City Royals
- Willie Kirkland (1955)
- Ray Mueller (1952-1953) MLB All-Star
- Hi Myers (1911-1912)
- Art Nehf (1913)
- Johnny Niggeling (1947)
- John O'Donoghue (1960) MLB All-Star
- Ed Phelps (1915)
- Jack Pfiester (1916) 1907 NL ERA Title
- Diego Segui (1960) 1970 AL ERA Title
- Hank Severeid (1908)
- Daryl Spencer (1950)
- Bill White (1954) 8x MLB All-Star

== Year-by-year records ==
Year	Record	Finish	Manager	Playoffs/notes
1905	80-68	4th	Jack Carney	No playoffs held
1906	69-81	4th	Jack Carney	No playoffs held
1907	56-90	6th	Billy Hart	No playoffs held
1910	108-60	1st	Babe Towne	No playoffs held League champions
1911	85-80	5th	Babe Towne	No playoffs held
1912	74-85	6th	George "Red" Andreas / Ducky Holmes	No playoffs held
1913	73-92	6th	Ducky Holmes / Josh Clarke	No playoffs held
1920	63-88	7th	George "Red" Andreas / Frank Metz	No playoffs held
1921	81-83	4th	Frank Metz / George "Red" Andreas	No playoffs held
1922	86-79	5th	Wally Mattick	No playoffs held
1923	59-105	7th	Frank Metz / Eddie Palmer; Wray Query	No playoffs held
