= Wichita Braves =

- 1887–1958; (1887, 1956 – 1958); Wichita, Kansas

Minor league affiliations
- Previous classes: Triple-A (1956–1958)
- League: American Association (1956–1958)
- Previous leagues: Kansas State League (1887); Western League (1887)

Major league affiliations
- Previous teams: Milwaukee Braves (1956–1958)

Team data
- Previous names: Wichita Braves (1887, 1956–1958)
- Previous parks: Lawrence-Dumont Stadium (1956–1958)

The Wichita Braves were an American Triple-A minor league baseball franchise based in Wichita, Kansas, that played in the American Association from 1956 to 1958 as the top affiliate of the Milwaukee Braves of the National League.

The Braves were immediately preceded in Wichita by the Class A Wichita Indians (1950–1955) of the Western League, who were an affiliate of the Baltimore Orioles. In 1959, Wichita moved to Fort Worth, Texas, to become the Fort Worth Cats, remaining in the American Association.

== History ==
In effect, the Wichita Braves were the successor of the Milwaukee Brewers, the Braves' predecessors in Milwaukee, Wisconsin. When the major-league Braves moved from Boston to Milwaukee in March 1953, they displaced their Triple-A affiliate, the Brewers. With Toledo, Ohio, without baseball (the original Toledo Mud Hens had pulled up stakes for Charleston, West Virginia, on June 23, 1952), the Brewers moved to Toledo and played three seasons there as the Toledo Sox. However, attendance fell by 50 percent—from 344,000 to 156,000—during those three years, and the Braves moved the club to Wichita for the 1956 season. They displaced a Class A Western League franchise and affiliate of the Baltimore Orioles, the Wichita Indians.

While the main Milwaukee club was achieving record attendance and securing two National League pennants within three years (narrowly missing the 1956 pennant by a single game), the transition of the Toledo-Wichita minor league team proved disappointing. Attendance at Wichita Braves games dropped another 50 percent compared to Toledo's figures, reaching just 101,000 in 1956, alongside a losing season. The numbers rebounded to 145,000 fans in 1957 for a Wichita team that won the pennant, led by the renowned minor league manager Ben Geraghty. But when the Wichita Braves fell to second place the following year, attendance dropped to 1956 levels. The Braves then moved their Triple-A affiliation to the Louisville Colonels, and the Wichita franchise transferred to become the Fort Worth Cats in Fort Worth, Texas, for 1959 as the American Association reorganized.

Professional baseball returned to Wichita when the Wichita Aeros joined the American Association as an expansion franchise in 1970.

== Notable alumni ==
- Ed Charles
- Wes Covington
- Joey Jay
- Lee Maye
- Don McMahon
- Juan Pizarro
- Claude Raymond
- Bob Uecker

== Sources ==
- Lloyd Johnson and Miles Wolff, editors. The Encyclopedia of Minor League Baseball, 1997 edition. Durham, North Carolina: Baseball America.
