= Ralph Winegarner =

American baseball player and manager (1909–1988)

- Pitcher/Utility player
- Born: October 29, 1909; Benton, Kansas
- Died: April 14, 1988 (aged 78); Wichita, Kansas
- Batted: Right Threw: Right

MLB debut
- September 20, 1930, for the Cleveland Indians

Last MLB appearance
- August 21, 1949, for the St. Louis Browns

MLB statistics
- Win–loss record (pitching): 8–6
- Earned run average: 5.33
- Strikeouts: 89
- Batting average: .276
- Home runs: 5
- Runs batted in: 28
- Stats at Baseball Reference

Teams
- Cleveland Indians (1930; 1932; 1934–36); St. Louis Browns (1949)

Ralph Lee Winegarner (October 29, 1909 – April 14, 1988) was an American professional baseball player, manager and coach. He played all or part of six seasons in Major League Baseball as a right-handed pitcher and third baseman for the Cleveland Indians (1930, 1932, 1934–1936) and St. Louis Browns (1949). Born in Benton, Kansas, he batted right-handed, stood 6 feet (1.8 m) tall and weighed 182 pounds (83 kg).

Winegarner's unusually long service gap between major league engagements (13 years and 17 days, spanning 1936 to 1949) is not the major league record, which belongs to Paul Schreiber. However, it is the longest service gap since the conclusion of WWII.

== Baseball career ==
Winegarner began his professional career in 1930 with the El Dorado Lions of the class-D Cotton States League as a third baseman. At the tail-end of the season, he was acquired by the Cleveland Indians, and he appeared in five games, all as a third baseman, getting 10 hits in 22 at bats for a .455 batting average. However, he also made three fielding errors in 21 chances, for a poor .857 fielding percentage.

After spending the 1931 season back in the minor leagues, he was converted to a pitcher in 1932. After starting the year with the Toledo Mud Hens, he was brought back up to the Indians in August. He appeared in seven games, two as a pinch hitter, four as a relief pitcher, and one as a starting pitcher. His first major league start resulted in his first major league win, a 6-4 complete game victory over the Chicago White Sox. Overall, he pitched 17.1 innings with a 1.04 ERA.

After spending 1933 with Toledo, Winegarner returned to the Indians in 1934, which was his first full season in the majors. Used mostly in relief, he appeared in 22 games as a pitcher, one as a right fielder, and nine as a pinch hitter. He posted a 5–4 record and batted .196, hitting his first major league home run on September 10 off Philadelphia Athletics pitcher George Caster.

In 1935, Winegarner was used more extensively as a hitter, as he pinch-hit 33 times, going 11-for-28 with five walks, including a pinch-hit home run on June 20 against the Washington Senators and Earl Whitehill. He also played left field, first base and third base, while also appearing in 25 games as a pitcher, posting a 2–2 record with a 5.75 ERA. He batted .310 in 84 at bats with a career-high 3 home runs and 17 RBI.

Winegarner began the 1936 season with the Indians, but was sent to the minor league New Orleans Pelicans in June after batting just .125 in his first 18 games while posting a 4.91 ERA in nine games as a pitcher. Winegarner remained in the minor leagues for the next five seasons, continuing to split his time between pitching and other positions, mostly first base. In 1942, he served as a player-manager for the San Antonio Missions of the Texas League.

After missing the 1943–45 seasons to World War II military service, he returned in 1946 to the Elmira Pioneers, a farm club of the St. Louis Browns, where he served as player-manager. In 1949, he was hired as a coach by the Browns, and in July he was added to the active roster. He appeared in nine games for the Browns in July and August, his first major league action in over thirteen years. He was used exclusively as a pitcher, posting no record and an ERA of 7.56. He was released at the end of the season, and remained with the team as a coach through the 1951 season. He returned to the Indians organization in 1952, serving as manager of the class-A Wichita Indians.
