= Lake Burnside =

Lake in Western Australia

- Oneahibunga
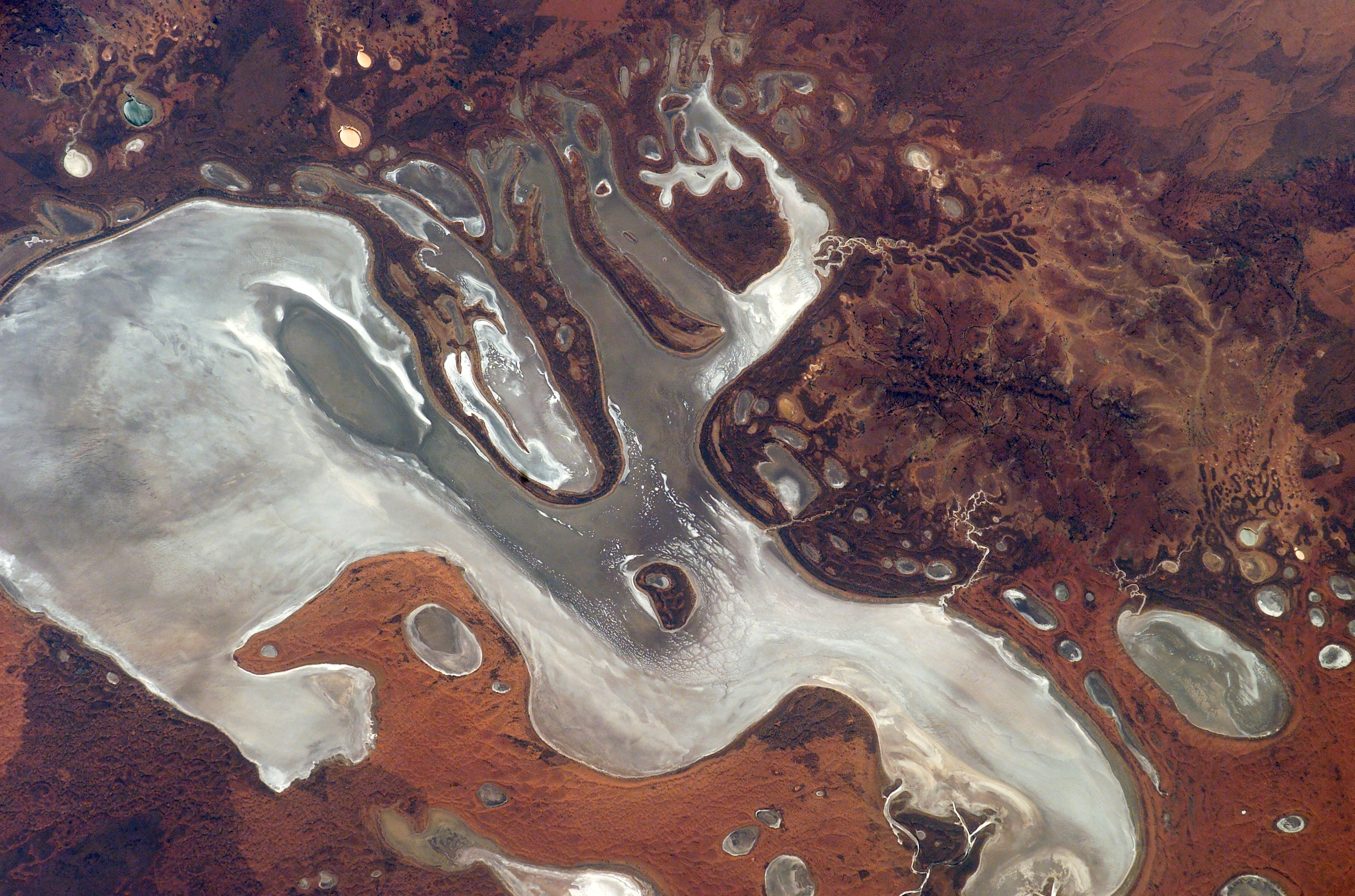
- Satellite image of Lake Burnside taken by STS-112 in 2002

- Location in Western Australia
- Interactive map of Lake Burnside
- Location: Gibson Desert, Western Australia
- Coordinates: 25°16′34″S 122°58′31″E
- Type: Salt lake
- Basin countries: Australia
- Surface area: 420 km^{2} (160 sq mi)

Lake Burnside, also known as Oneahibunga, is a lake in the Gibson Desert, in the Mid West region of Western Australia, northeast of Lake Carnegie. The smaller Lake Buchanan lies just to the south. It covers an area of roughly 42,000 hectares (100,000 acres).

== See also ==
- List of lakes of Australia § Western Australia
