= Fred Richards (baseball) =

American baseball player (1927–2016)

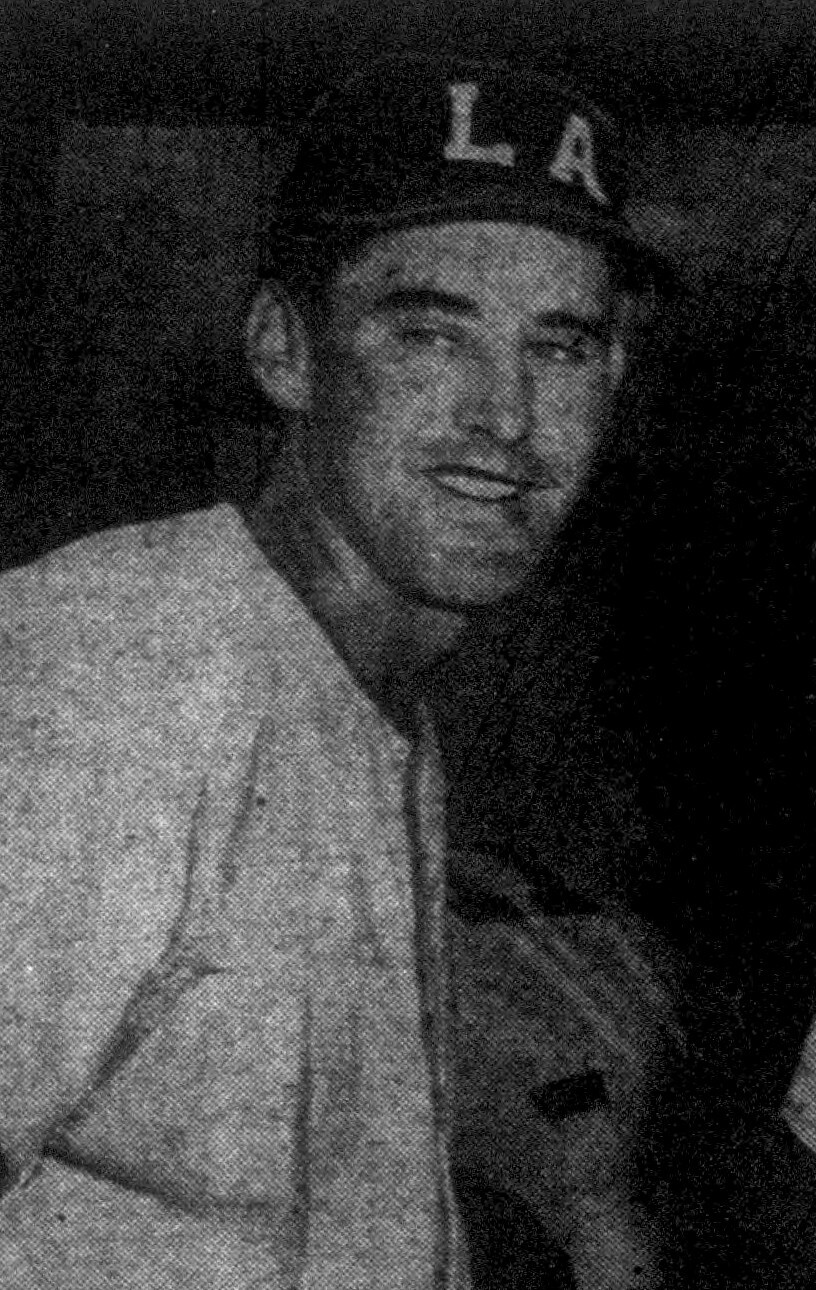
- Richards, circa 1953
- First baseman
- Born: November 3, 1927; Leavittsburg, Ohio, U.S.
- Died: March 18, 2016 (aged 88); Warren, Ohio, U.S.
- Batted: Left Threw: Left

MLB debut
- September 15, 1951, for the Chicago Cubs

Last MLB appearance
- September 30, 1951, for the Chicago Cubs

MLB statistics
- Batting average: .296
- Home runs: 0
- Runs batted in: 4
- Stats at Baseball Reference

Teams
- Chicago Cubs (1951)

Fred Charles Richards (November 3, 1927 – March 18, 2016), nicknamed "Fuzzy", was an American professional baseball player. Richards, a first baseman, played eleven seasons of minor league baseball and appeared in ten games played in the Major Leagues for the Chicago Cubs in the waning weeks of the 1951 season. He threw and batted left-handed, stood 6 feet 1 inch (1.85 m) tall and weighed 185 pounds (84 kg).

Born in Warren, Ohio in 1927, Richards signed with the Cubs in 1946 as a 19-year-old. He had finished his sixth season in the Cubs' farm system when he was called to the Majors in 1951. Ironically, 1951 had been Richards' worst pro season, as he batted only .223 in 120 games split between the Class A Des Moines Bruins and the Triple-A Springfield Cubs. In his first at bat on September 15, facing Sheldon Jones, he flied out to center fielder Willie Mays of the New York Giants, but overall he collected eight hits (including two doubles) in 27 at bats during his Major League audition. Richards would split 1952 between Des Moines and Springfield again, but he never returned to the Major Leagues.
