= Chuck Kress =

American baseball player (1921–2014)

- First baseman
- Born: December 9, 1921; Philadelphia, Pennsylvania, U.S.
- Died: March 4, 2014 (aged 92); Colville, Washington, U.S.
- Batted: Left Threw: Left

MLB debut
- April 16, 1947, for the Cincinnati Reds

Last MLB appearance
- July 8, 1954, for the Brooklyn Dodgers

MLB statistics
- Batting average: .249
- Home runs: 1
- Runs batted in: 52
- Stats at Baseball Reference

Teams
- Cincinnati Reds (1947, 1949); Chicago White Sox (1949–1950); Detroit Tigers (1954); Brooklyn Dodgers (1954)

Charles Steven Kress (December 9, 1921 – March 4, 2014) was an American professional baseball player and manager.

== Biography ==
This first baseman played in all or parts of four seasons in Major League Baseball (MLB) between 1947 and 1954 for the Cincinnati Reds, Chicago White Sox, Detroit Tigers and Brooklyn Dodgers, appearing in 175 games. His seventeen-year active career was interrupted by three years' service in the United States Army during World War II (1943–1945). Kress was born in Philadelphia, where he attended Frankford High School.

Kress threw and batted left-handed, and was listed as 6 feet (1.8 m) tall and 190 pounds (86 kg). In MLB, he appeared in one full season, 1949, and parts of three others. In that full campaign, he began the year with the Reds, got into twenty-seven games, then was sold to the White Sox in June. In Chicago, he batted .278 in ninety-seven games with 104 hits and became the White Sox' regular first baseman. But only one of his hits was a home run, and after Kress began 1950 by going hitless in eight at bats, he was sold to the St. Louis Cardinals' organization and returned to the minor leagues. A productive 1953 season (25 home runs, 121 runs batted in, and .321 batting average) earned him one further partial season in the majors, 1954, when he appeared in thirty-seven games for the Tigers and Dodgers and batted .163, largely as a pinch hitter. He played professionally into the 1959 season.

In his 175 big-league games, Kress batted .249 with 116 hits, including twenty doubles. His lone MLB home run was a solo shot off the Tigers' Fred Hutchinson on July 1.

As a minor leaguer, he got into 1,745 games and became a manager in the Tigers' and Philadelphia Phillies' farm systems.

He retired from baseball in 1961, and moved to Rush Lake, Minnesota, in 1973, to St. Joseph, Missouri, in 1980, and to Sandpoint, Idaho, in 2002.
