= Rush Lake (Minnesota) =

Lake in the state of Minnesota, United States

- Location within Minnesota Location within the United States
- Location: Otter Tail County, Minnesota
- Coordinates: 46.4865°N 95.5299°W
- Basin countries: United States
- Surface area: 5,338 acres (21.60 km^{2})
- Max. depth: 68 ft (21 m)

Rush Lake is a lake located in Rush Lake and Otto Townships in Otter Tail County, Minnesota.

== Size and Shape ==
Rush Lake is in the general shape of a gourd, covering an area of 5,338 acres (21.60 km^{2}) and reaching a maximum depth of 68 feet (21 m). Despite the said maximum depth, most of the lake is rather shallow with 62 percent of the lake less than 15 feet (4.6 m) in depth.

== Location ==
Rush lake is located to the north of Buchanan Lake, and to the northeast of the much larger Otter Tail Lake.
