= Des Moines Bruins =

American minor league baseball team

- 1947–1961; Des Moines, Iowa

Minor league affiliations
- Class: Class B (1959–1961); Class A (1947–1958)
- League: Three-I League (1959–1961); Western League (1947–1958)

Major league affiliations
- Team: Philadelphia Phillies (1959–1961); Los Angeles Dodgers (1958); Chicago Cubs (1947–1957)

Minor league titles
- League titles (2): 1953; 1954

Team data
- Name: Des Moines Demons (1959–1961); Des Moines Bruins (1947–1958)
- Ballpark: Sec Taylor Stadium (1947–1961)

The Des Moines Bruins was the longest-used name of a minor league baseball team based in Des Moines, Iowa. The team played in the Western League from 1947 to 1958 and in the Three-I League from 1959–1961, where they were known as the Des Moines Demons. Their home ballpark was Pioneer Memorial Stadium, and they were affiliated with the Chicago Cubs (1947–1957), Los Angeles Dodgers (1958), and Philadelphia Phillies (1959–1961).

== History ==
=== The Rebirth of the Demons ===
In 1959, the Demons name was revived after 21 years of non-usage. The new Des Moines Demons were a Philadelphia Phillies farm club in the Three-I League. Managed by Chuck Kress, they finished second in the first half (38–26) then won the second-half pennant (40–29) before falling to the first-half champion Green Bay Bluejays in the championship three games to one. Cal Emery hit .323 and led the league with 281 total bases, 27 homers and 129 RBI.

In 1960, Andy Seminick took over as manager and the Demons went 64–74, tied for last in the Three-I. Jerry Reimer hit .331 with 18 home runs and led the league with 179 hits and 294 total bases. Ray Culp went 6–7 and had a 6.59 ERA, not indicative of his future big-league performance.

The final year was a poor one. Kress was managing again and Des Moines finished last – by a wide margin, with a pitiful 37–93 record. They were so bad every other team in the Three-I League's final season of existence finished .500 or better. Five pitchers lost in double digits while no one won more than six contests. Dick Haines led the league with a .355 average while future big-leaguer Pat Corrales batted .309. The Demons name has not been used since that time by the Des Moines teams – when organized baseball returned to the city in 1969 the club was called the Iowa Oaks.

== Year-by-year record ==
Year	Record	Finish	Manager	Playoffs
1947	75–52	2nd	Jim Keesey	Lost in 1st round
1948	76–64	1st	Stan Hack	Lost in 1st round
1949	70–70	4th	Stan Hack	Lost League Finals
1950	84–70	3rd	Charlie Root	Lost in 1st round
1951	73–78	5th	Al Todd	
1952	57–97	8th	Harry Strohm	
1953	77–78	4th	Kemp Wicker / Bruce Edwards	Champions
1954	88–66	2nd	Les Peden	Champions
1955	77–74	4th	Les Peden (37–45) / Pepper Martin (40–29)	Lost League Finals
1956	72–67	3rd	Lou Klein	
1957	60–92	8th	Lou Stringer / Hersh Martin	none
1958	61–83	8th	Roy Hartsfield	none
