= Frank Isbell =

American baseball player (1875–1941)

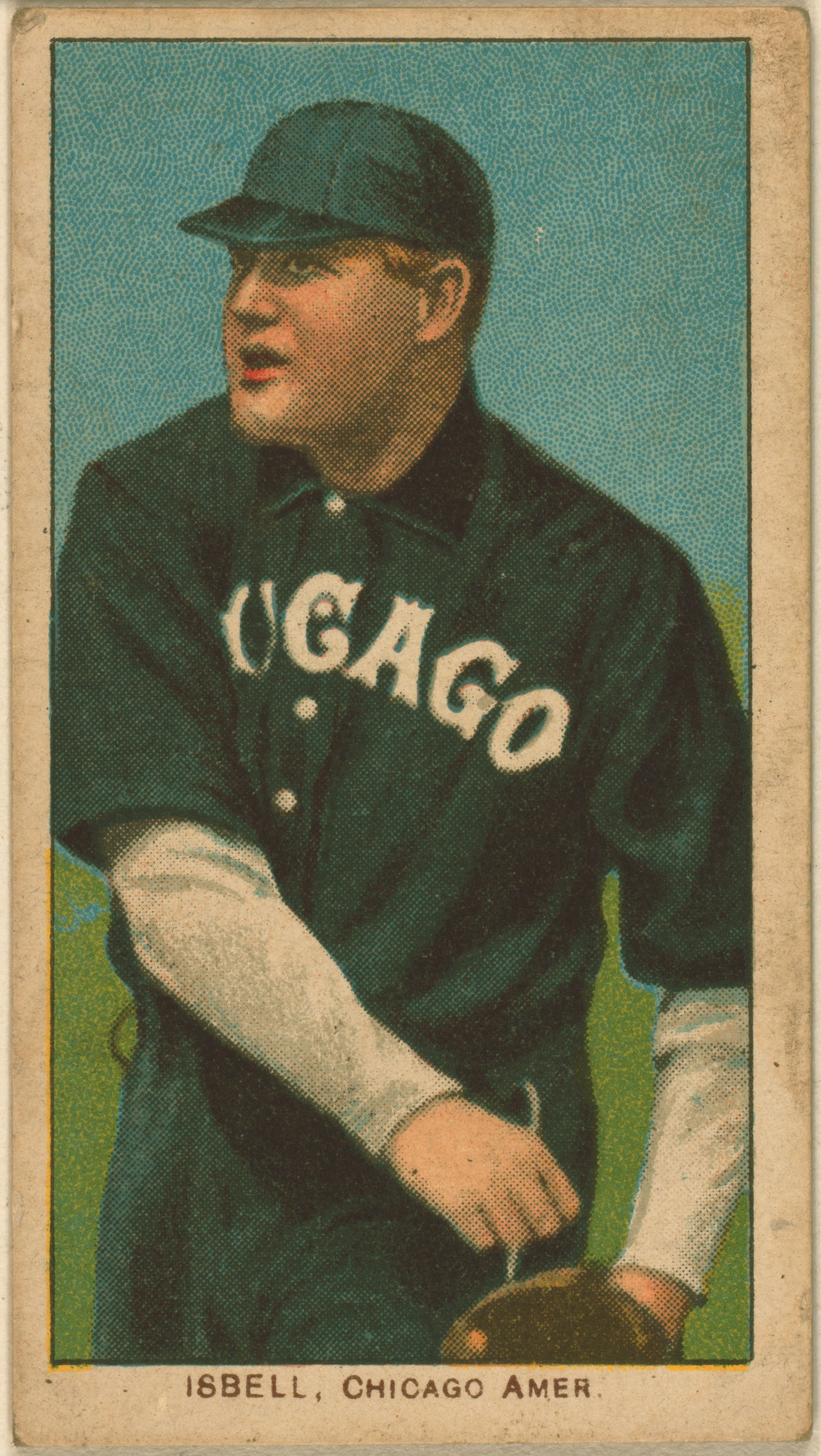
- First baseman / Second baseman
- Born: August 21, 1875; Delevan, New York, U.S.
- Died: July 15, 1941 (aged 65); Wichita, Kansas, U.S.
- Batted: Left Threw: Right

MLB debut
- May 1, 1898, for the Chicago Orphans

Last MLB appearance
- October 3, 1909, for the Chicago White Sox

MLB statistics
- Batting average: .250
- Home runs: 13
- Runs batted in: 455
- Stolen bases: 253
- Stats at Baseball Reference

Teams
- Chicago Orphans (1898); Chicago White Stockings/White Sox (1901–1909)

Career highlights and awards
- World Series champion (1906); AL stolen base leader (1901)

William Frank Isbell (August 21, 1875 – July 15, 1941) was an American Major League Baseball first baseman, second baseman, and outfielder in the 1900s.

== Career ==
Born in Delevan, New York, Isbell was nicknamed Bald Eagle due to his receding hairline, something he was quite sensitive about. Isbell was a good enough hitter to earn a starting spot on some very good White Sox teams, including the pennant-winning 1901 team, managed by Clark Griffith, the second-place 1905 team led by Fielder Jones, and finally the 1906 World Series champion White Sox team that included shortstop George Davis and pitchers Doc White and Ed Walsh. It was known as one of the worst-hitting teams to ever win the World Series, with only Davis and Isbell hitting above .260 (Davis hit .277, Isbell .279).

He played for the Chicago Cubs in 1898, briefly, with 37 hits in 159 at bats (.233 batting average), and pitched as well as playing the outfield. Thirteen of his seventeen games pitched came with the Cubs.

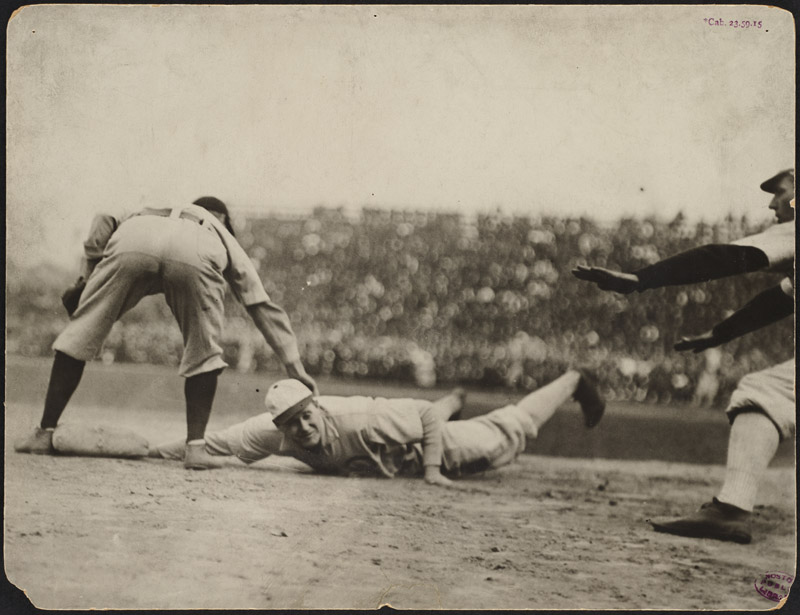
Isbell safe at first after pickoff attempt during the 1906 World Series

After not being seen in baseball for the next year, Isbell showed up again in 1900 playing for the Chicago White Sox as a full-time first baseman. The American League was not recognized in the Majors until 1901. Isbell played with the Sox until 1909. He batted left-handed and threw right-handed.

Isbell set many offensive World Series records that year, including doubles and extra base hits in a game. Until 2025, Isbell was the only player to get four extra-base hits in a single postseason game. However, he was better known for his outstanding speed, including his 1901 season when he had 52 stolen bases and led the Majors. He averaged 37 steals a year and ended with 253 for his career.

In 1,119 games, Isbell finished with a .250 batting average with 13 home runs and 455 RBIs. He had 1,056 career hits in 4,219 at bats. As a pitcher, he went 4–7 with a 3.59 ERA.

Isbell also became notable for being manager and owner of many teams in the Western League. He died in Wichita, Kansas.

== See also ==
- List of Major League Baseball annual stolen base leaders
- List of Major League Baseball career stolen bases leaders
