= Pueblo Braves =

Minor league baseball team in Pueblo, Colorado

- 1928–1932; Pueblo, Colorado

Minor league affiliations
- Previous classes: Class A
- League: Western League

Team data
- Previous names: Pueblo Braves (1930–1932); Pueblo Steelworkers (1928–1929)

The Pueblo Braves were a minor league baseball team that was located in Pueblo, Colorado and played in the Western League for five seasons, from 1928 to 1932. However, they were known as the Pueblo Steelworkers for their first two seasons (1928 and 1929).

They folded ahead of the 1933 season. Their overall record in their five seasons in the Western League was 367 wins and 402 losses.
