= Pueblo Dodgers =

- 1947–1958; Pueblo, Colorado

Minor league affiliations
- Class: Class A (1947–1958)
- League: Western League (1947–1958)

Major league affiliations
- Team: Chicago Cubs (1958); Brooklyn Dodgers (1947–1957)

Minor league titles
- League titles (2): 1947; 1949

Team data
- Name: Pueblo Bruins (1958); Pueblo Dodgers (1947–1957)
- Ballpark: County Park/Runyon Field

The Pueblo Dodgers were a Class A minor league baseball team that was located in Pueblo, Colorado and played in the Western League from 1947 to 1958.

== History ==
An affiliate of the Brooklyn/Los Angeles Dodgers (1947-1957 and the Chicago Cubs (1958), Pueblo won Western League Championships in 1947 and 1949. The franchise folded when the Western League dissolved in 1959.

== Ballparks ==
The Dodgers played at a stadium called "County Park" in 1948 with the name changed to "Runyon Field" in 1948. Today it is known as Hobbs Field, within the Runyon Sports Complex.

== Notable alumni ==
Hall of Fame Alumni

- Walter Alston (Player/MGR, 1948) Inducted 1976
- Sparky Anderson (1954) Inducted, 2000
- Billy Williams (1958) Inducted, 1987

Notable Alumni

- George Altman (1958) 3 x MLB All-Star
- Roger Craig (1954)
- Don Demeter (1955)
- Roy Face (1950) 6 x MLB All-Star
- Jim Gentile (1953-1954) 6 x MLB All-Star; 1961 AL RBI Leader
- Billy Hunter (1952) MLB All-Star
- Clem Labine (1948) 2 x MLB All-Star
- Bob Lillis (1951)
- Turk Lown (1947)
- John Roseboro (1955) 6 x MLB All-Star
- Bill Sharman (1950) Member of the Naismith Memorial Basketball Hall of Fame
- Larry Sherry (1956) 1959 World Series: Most Valuable Player
- Dave Stenhouse (1958) 2 x MLB All-Star
- Maury Wills (1953, 1956) 7 x MLB All-Star; 6 x NL Stolen Base Leader; 1962 NL Most Valuable Player
