= Muskogee Oilers =

American minor league baseball team in 1933

The Muskogee Oilers were a professional, minor league baseball team that played in the Western League in 1933. They began the year in Wichita, Kansas as the Wichita Oilers, but moved to Muskogee, Oklahoma after being evicted from their park in Wichita. Hall of Famer Rube Marquard managed the team at one point, while All-Star pitchers Mort Cooper and Kirby Higbe played for the club.
