= Extra-base hit =

In baseball, a hit that allows the batter to advance beyond first base

In baseball, an extra-base hit (EB, EBH or XBH), also known as a long hit, is any base hit on which the batter is able to advance past first base without the benefit of a fielder either committing an error or opting to make a throw to retire another base runner (see fielder's choice). Extra-base hits are often not listed separately in tables of baseball statistics, but are easily determined by calculating the sum total of a batter's doubles, triples, and home runs. Extra-base hits are particularly valuable because they ensure that there will be no runners on base that will be forced to advance on the next fair ball.

Another related statistic of interest that can be calculated is "extra bases on long hits". A batter gets three of these for each home run, two for each triple, and one for each double. Thus, leading the league in "Most extra bases in long hits" is a significant accomplishment in power hitting.

The statistic Extra-Base Hits Allowed (for example by a pitcher or by the fielding team in general) is denoted by the abbreviation XBA.

== Major League Baseball leaders ==
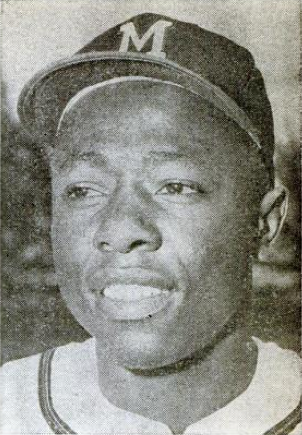
Hank Aaron holds the record for most extra-base hits, at 1,477.

=== Career ===
The record for most career extra-base hits is 1,477, held by Hank Aaron. Among players with at least 1,000 career hits, Mark McGwire is the only one to have had at least half of his hits go for extra bases.

=== Season ===
There have been 15 instances of a player recording 100 extra-base hits in a single season; Lou Gehrig, Chuck Klein and Todd Helton are the only players to have achieved this twice, with Helton the only one to do so in consecutive seasons.

The top 5 are as follows: (totals are current through the end of the 2025 season)

1. Babe Ruth (1921) – 119
2. Lou Gehrig (1927) – 117
3. Barry Bonds (2001) – 107
4. Chuck Klein (1930) – 107
5. Todd Helton (2001) – 105

=== Single game ===
The modern-era record for most extra-base hits by one batter, in one game, is five, held by 16 different players, including Lou Boudreau, Joe Adcock, Willie Stargell, Steve Garvey, Shawn Green, Kelly Shoppach, Josh Hamilton, Jackie Bradley Jr., Kris Bryant, José Ramírez, Matt Carpenter, Alex Dickerson, Luis Urías, Adolis García, Shohei Ohtani, and most recently, Nick Kurtz. Adcock, Green, Hamilton, and Kurtz did so while hitting four home runs. In the postseason, Albert Pujols, Hideki Matsui, Bob Robertson, Frank Isbell and Enrique Hernández have all recorded four extra-base hits in a game.

=== Consecutive games ===
Paul Waner (1927) and Chipper Jones (2006) jointly hold the longest hitting streak for extra bases. Both players recorded extra-base hits in 14 consecutive games. (Note: Longest streak of consecutive games, in the regular season, requiring extra-base hits ≥ 1, sorted by most games matching criteria.)

== Team records ==
The Boston Red Sox recorded 17 extra-base hits in a 29–4 victory against the St. Louis Browns in 1950. In the postseason, the team single game record for extra-base hits is 13, by the New York Yankees against the Red Sox in game 3 of the 2004 ALCS. Two teams have 9 extra-base hits in a World Series game, namely the 1925 Pittsburgh Pirates (in game 7 vs the Washington Senators) and the 2007 Boston Red Sox (game 1, vs the Colorado Rockies).

The 2003 Boston Red Sox had 649 extra-base hits, the most by one team in a single season.

== See also ==
- Slugging average
- Total bases
