= Joe Wilhoit =

American baseball player (1885–1930)

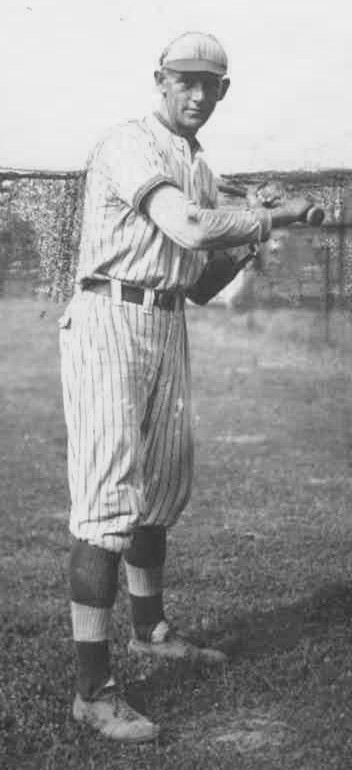
- Outfielder
- Born: December 20, 1885; Hiawatha, Kansas, U.S.
- Died: September 25, 1930 (aged 44); Santa Barbara, California, U.S.
- Batted: Left Threw: Right

MLB debut
- April 12, 1916, for the Boston Braves

Last MLB appearance
- September 28, 1919, for the Boston Red Sox

MLB statistics
- Batting average: .257
- Home runs: 3
- Runs batted in: 73
- Stats at Baseball Reference

Teams
- Boston Braves (1916–1917); Pittsburgh Pirates (1917); New York Giants (1917–1918); Boston Red Sox (1919)

Joseph William Wilhoit (December 20, 1885 – September 25, 1930) was an American outfielder in Major League Baseball, playing mainly as a right fielder from 1916 through 1919 for the Boston Braves (1916–1917), Pittsburgh Pirates (1917), New York Giants (1917–1918), and Boston Red Sox (1919). Listed at 6 ft 2 in (1.88 m) and 175 pounds (79 kg), Wilhoit batted left-handed and threw right-handed.

== Early life ==
A native of Hiawatha, Kansas. He attended and played baseball at DePaul University (then St. Vincent's College). He was also a hurdler, shot putter and pole vaulter. In 1906, he set a pole vault record in Southern California of 10 feet, 9 and 3/4 inches.

== Career ==
Wilhoit joined the Vernon Tigers, led by Happy Hogan. He then joined the Boston Braves in 1915. He was later sold to the New York Giants. He played with the Giants from 1917 to 1918. In 1919, he joined the Wichita Jobbers of the Western League. He retired from the Salt Lake City Bees in 1923.

In a four-season career, Wilhoit was a .257 hitter (201-for-782) with three home runs and 73 RBI in 283 games, including 93 runs, 23 doubles, nine triples, 28 stolen bases, and a .323 on-base percentage. He also appeared in Games 2 and 6 of the 1917 World Series as a pinch-hitter and went 0-for-1 with a walk.

After the war, Wilhoit and his wife eventually settling in Santa Barbara, California. They opened up a luggage store on State Street, called Wilhoit's Luggage. It was later sold to Lindy Lindhorst, the top salesman at the store, who renamed it Lindy's.

== Personal life ==
Wilhoit married Zulekiah Katherine Hicks, who worked as the personal secretary to one of the top Generals during World War I at the Department of War.

Wilhoit died on September 25, 1930, in Santa Barbara. He was buried in Calvary Cemetery in Santa Barbara.

== Statistics ==
- Wilhoit posted the longest hitting streak in baseball history with 69 games while playing for the Wichita Jobbers of the Western League. From June 14 to August 19, 1919, he went 153-for-297 for a .515 batting average to set the record streak. His hits included four home runs, nine triples and 24 doubles.
