= Colorado Springs Sky Sox (Western League) =

- 1950–1958; Colorado Springs, Colorado

Minor league affiliations
- Class: Class A (1950–1958)
- League: Western League (1950–1958)

Major league affiliations
- Team: Chicago White Sox (1950–1958)

Minor league titles
- Pennants (3): 1953; 1955; 1958

Team data
- Name: Colorado Springs Sky Sox (1950–1958)
- Ballpark: Spurgeon Stadium

The Colorado Springs Sky Sox were a Minor League Baseball team in Colorado Springs, Colorado, from 1950 to 1958. The team played in the Class A Western League as a farm team for the Chicago White Sox.

The Sky Sox won the league pennant in 1953, 1955, and 1958. The name 'Sky Sox' was chosen in a name-the-team contest and referred to both the team's affiliation with the Chicago White Sox and the altitude of Colorado Springs.

When the Western League folded at the end of the 1958 season, the club also ceased operations. The Pikes Peak region was without professional baseball for 30 years until 1988, when the Hawaii Islanders of the Pacific Coast League relocated to Colorado Springs and became the second incarnation of the Sky Sox; they moved after 2018 to become the Triple-A San Antonio Missions.
