= Les Peden =

American baseball player (1923-2002)

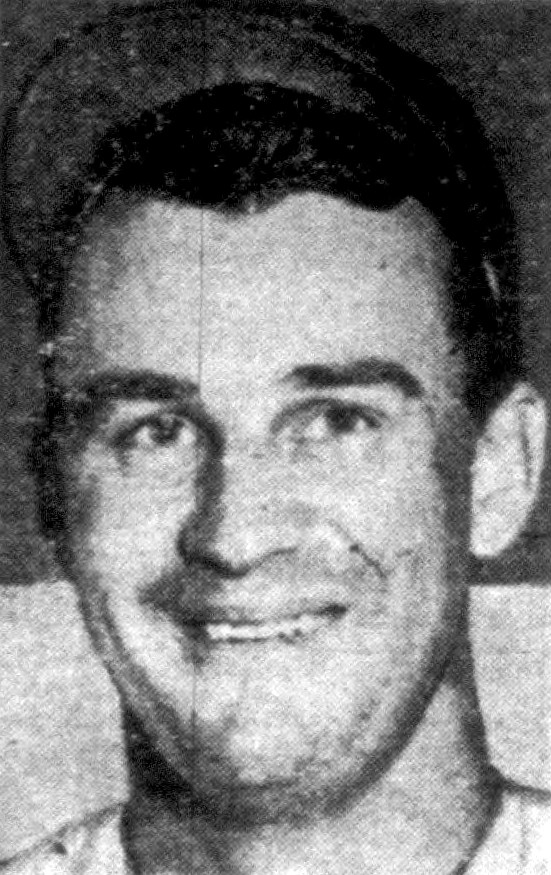
- Peden, circa 1953
- Catcher
- Born: September 17, 1923; Azle, Texas, U.S.
- Died: February 11, 2002 (aged 78); Jacksonville, Florida, U.S.
- Batted: Right Threw: Right

MLB debut
- April 17, 1953, for the Washington Senators

Last MLB appearance
- May 6, 1953, for the Washington Senators

MLB statistics
- Batting average: .250
- Home runs: 1
- Runs batted in: 1
- Stats at Baseball Reference

Teams
- Washington Senators (1953)

Leslie Earl Peden (September 17, 1923 – February 11, 2002), nicknamed "Gooch", was an American professional baseball player and manager. A catcher, he appeared in nine Major League games for the 1953 Washington Senators. He threw and batted right-handed, stood 6 feet 1 inch (1.85 m) tall and weighed 212 pounds (96 kg).

The native of Azle, Texas, attended Texas A&M University and served in the United States Army in the European Theater of Operations during World War II. His minor league playing career lasted all or parts of 18 seasons, largely in the organizations of the Chicago Cubs and Kansas City Athletics. He was selected by Washington in the 1952 Rule 5 draft after he batted .279 with 18 home runs in 153 games for the Open-Classification Los Angeles Angels of the Pacific Coast League.

For the first month of the 1953 MLB season, Peden was a member of the Senators' 28-man roster. Of his nine games, eight were as Washington's starting catcher. On April 29, he hit his only Major League home run, a solo shot off Saul Rogovin of the Chicago White Sox, in a 3–0 Washington victory at Comiskey Park. Peden caught Bob Porterfield's complete game, five-hit shutout that day. He collected his second extra-base hit, a double, off the Detroit Tigers' Hal Erickson on May 5, as he caught another complete game win for Porterfield. The double was the last of Peden's seven MLB hits and raised his batting average to .292.

After going hitless on May 6 against Detroit's Ned Garver, Peden was returned to the Cubs' organization and the PCL Angels when rosters were reduced to 25 men at the May 15 cutdown. Peden then continued his lengthy minor league career, spending ten seasons as a playing manager in the Cubs and Athletics' farm systems. In 1965, he was listed as a member of the Cubs' College of Coaches, although he worked as manager of the Short-season Class A Wenatchee Chiefs of the Northwest League that season. He managed in Triple-A for three seasons, with the Portland Beavers (1962–63) and Tacoma Cubs (1966). After 1966, he served the Cubs as a scout.

== See also ==
- College of Coaches
