= Sioux City Indians =

The Sioux City Indians were a minor league baseball team that played in the Western League from 1914 to 1919. They were based in Sioux City, Iowa.

== Year-by-year record ==
Year	Record	Finish	Manager	Playoffs	
1914	105-60	1st	Josh Clarke	none League Champs	
1915	66-68	6th	Josh Clarke / Harry Gaspar	none	
1916	79-71	3rd	Harry Gaspar	none	
1917	80-66 overall	--	Ed Holly	--	Team moved to St. Joseph August 5
1918	22-42	8th	Ducky Holmes	League suspended operations July 7	
1919	69-69	5th	Charley Schmidt		
