= Lake Buchanan (Western Australia) =

Lake in Western Australia

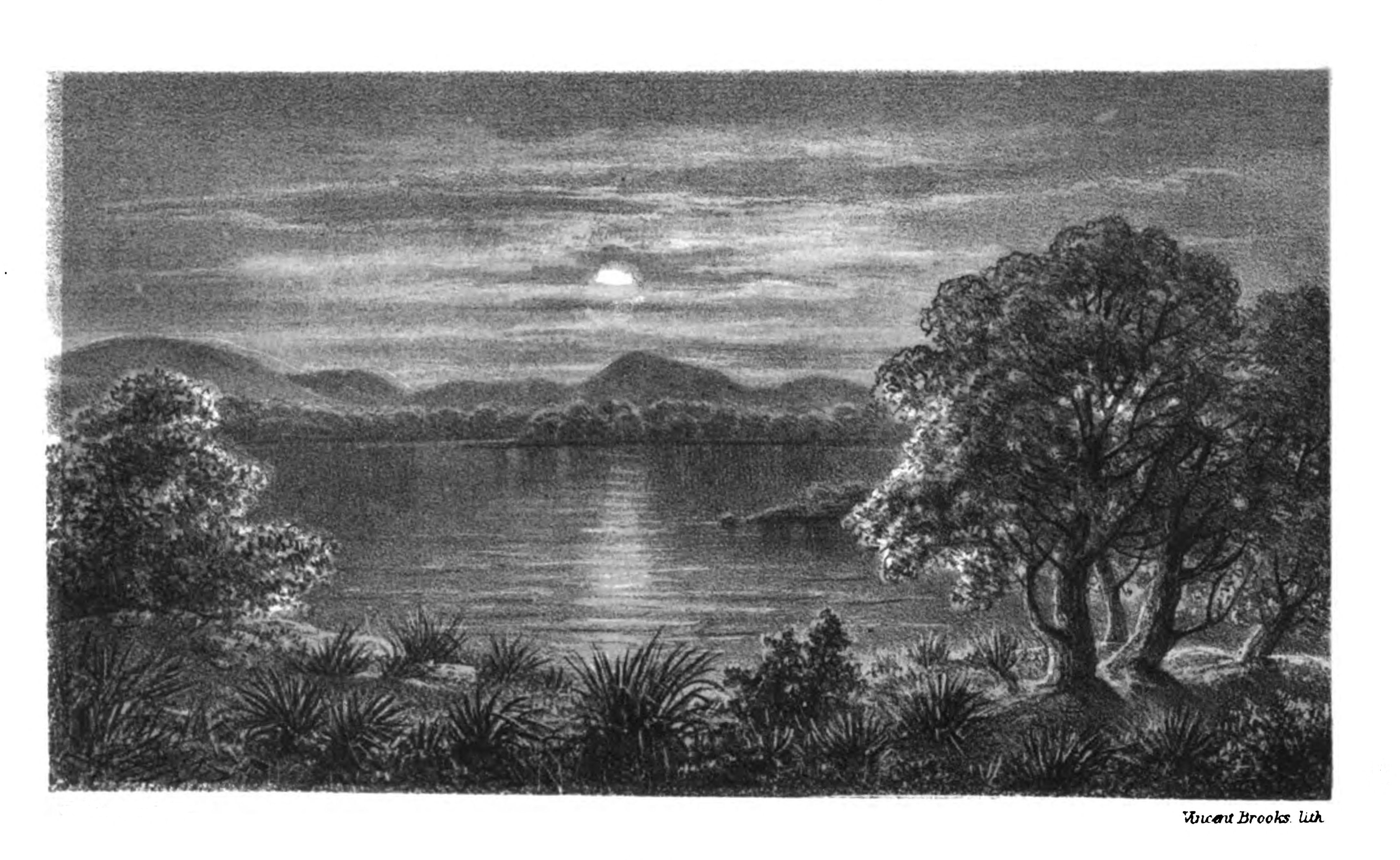
- Tracks of McKinlay and Party Across Australia 0176

- Location within Western Australia
- Interactive map of Lake Buchanan
- Location: Gibson Desert, Western Australia
- Coordinates: 25°33′35″S 123°2′51″E
- Primary inflows: Coomborn Creek
- Surface area: 4,300 ha (11,000 acres)

Lake Buchanan is a lake in the Gibson Desert of Western Australia, northeast of Lake Carnegie, just south of Oneahibunga / Lake Burnside. It covers an area of approximately 4,300 hectares (10,626 acres). It is fed by Coomborn Creek on its western side.

The Lake is saline, and is a source of mined salt.

== See also ==
- List of lakes of Australia § Western Australia
