= Paul Musser =

American baseball player (1889–1973)

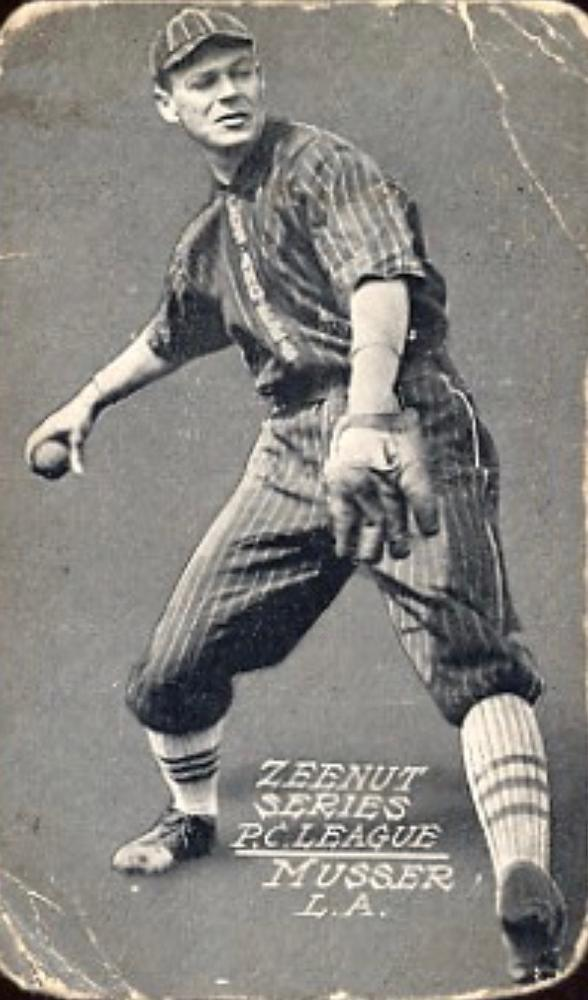
- Pitcher
- Born: June 24, 1889; Millheim, Pennsylvania, U.S.
- Died: July 7, 1973 (aged 84); State College, Pennsylvania, U.S.
- Batted: Right Threw: Right

MLB debut
- June 6, 1912, for the Washington Senators

Last MLB appearance
- August 12, 1919, for the Boston Red Sox

MLB statistics
- Win–loss record: 0–2
- Earned run average: 3.35
- Strikeouts: 24
- Stats at Baseball Reference

Teams
- Washington Senators (1912); Boston Red Sox (1919)

Paul Musser (June 24, 1889 – July 7, 1973) was an American pitcher in Major League Baseball who played for the Washington Senators (1912) and Boston Red Sox (1919). Listed at 6 ft 0 in (1.83 m), 175 lb., Musser batted and threw right-handed. A native of Millheim, Pennsylvania, he attended Susquehanna University.

In a two-season career, Musser posted a 0–2 record with a 3.35 ERA in 12 appearances, including six starts, one complete game, two saves, 24 strikeouts, 24 walks, and 40 1/3 innings of work.

Musser died at the age of 84 in State College, Pennsylvania.
