= Josh Clarke (baseball) =

American baseball player (1879–1962)

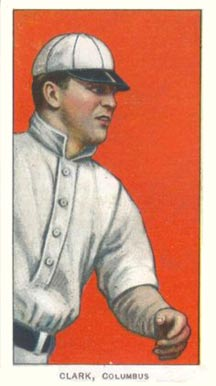
- Outfielder
- Born: March 8, 1879; Winfield, Kansas, U.S.
- Died: July 2, 1962 (aged 83); Ventura, California, U.S.
- Batted: Left Threw: Right

MLB debut
- June 15, 1898, for the Louisville Colonels

Last MLB appearance
- May 23, 1911, for the Boston Rustlers

MLB statistics
- Batting average: .239
- Home runs: 5
- Runs batted in: 43
- Stats at Baseball Reference

Teams
- Louisville Colonels (1898); St. Louis Cardinals (1905); Cleveland Naps (1908–1909); Boston Rustlers (1911)

Joshua Baldwin Clarke (March 8, 1879 – July 2, 1962) was an American Major League Baseball outfielder who played for five seasons. He played for the Louisville Colonels in 1898, the St. Louis Cardinals in 1905, the Cleveland Naps from 1908 to 1909, and the Boston Rustlers in 1911. He is the brother of National Baseball Hall of Famer Fred Clarke.
