= Bud Bates =

American baseball player (1912-1987)

- Outfielder
- Born: March 16, 1912; Los Angeles, California, U.S.
- Died: April 29, 1987 (aged 75); Long Beach, California, U.S.
- Batted: Right Threw: Right

MLB debut
- September 16, 1939, for the Philadelphia Phillies

Last MLB appearance
- October 1, 1939, for the Philadelphia Phillies

MLB statistics
- Batting average: .259
- Home runs: 1
- Runs batted in: 2
- Stats at Baseball Reference

Teams
- Philadelphia Phillies (1939)

Hubert Edgar "Buddy" Bates (March 16, 1912 – April 29, 1987) was an American professional baseball player whose 18-year active career took place over a quarter century — between 1931 and 1955. All but 15 of Bates' games played occurred in the minor leagues, however. In his only trial in Major League Baseball, the outfielder spent September 1939 with the Philadelphia Phillies, where he collected 15 hits in 58 at bats; he scored eight runs.

Included among those 15 safeties was one big-league home run, struck September 29, 1939, at Shibe Park against Hal Schumacher of the New York Giants. Despite Bates' three hits in that game, the Phillies lost, 8–3 — one of 106 losses they would suffer during that season.

Born in Los Angeles, Bates batted and threw right-handed. He stood 6 feet (1.8 m) tall and weighed 165 pounds (75 kg). His long minor league career was interrupted by United States Navy service during World War II. After the war, Bates became a player-manager and logged 11 seasons as a skipper, including 21/2 years with the Double-A Atlanta Crackers; his 1957 Crackers won the Southern Association championship. He last managed in the Baltimore Orioles' organization in 1961.

Bud Bates died in Long Beach, California, at age 75.
