= Al Todd =

American baseball player (1902–1985)

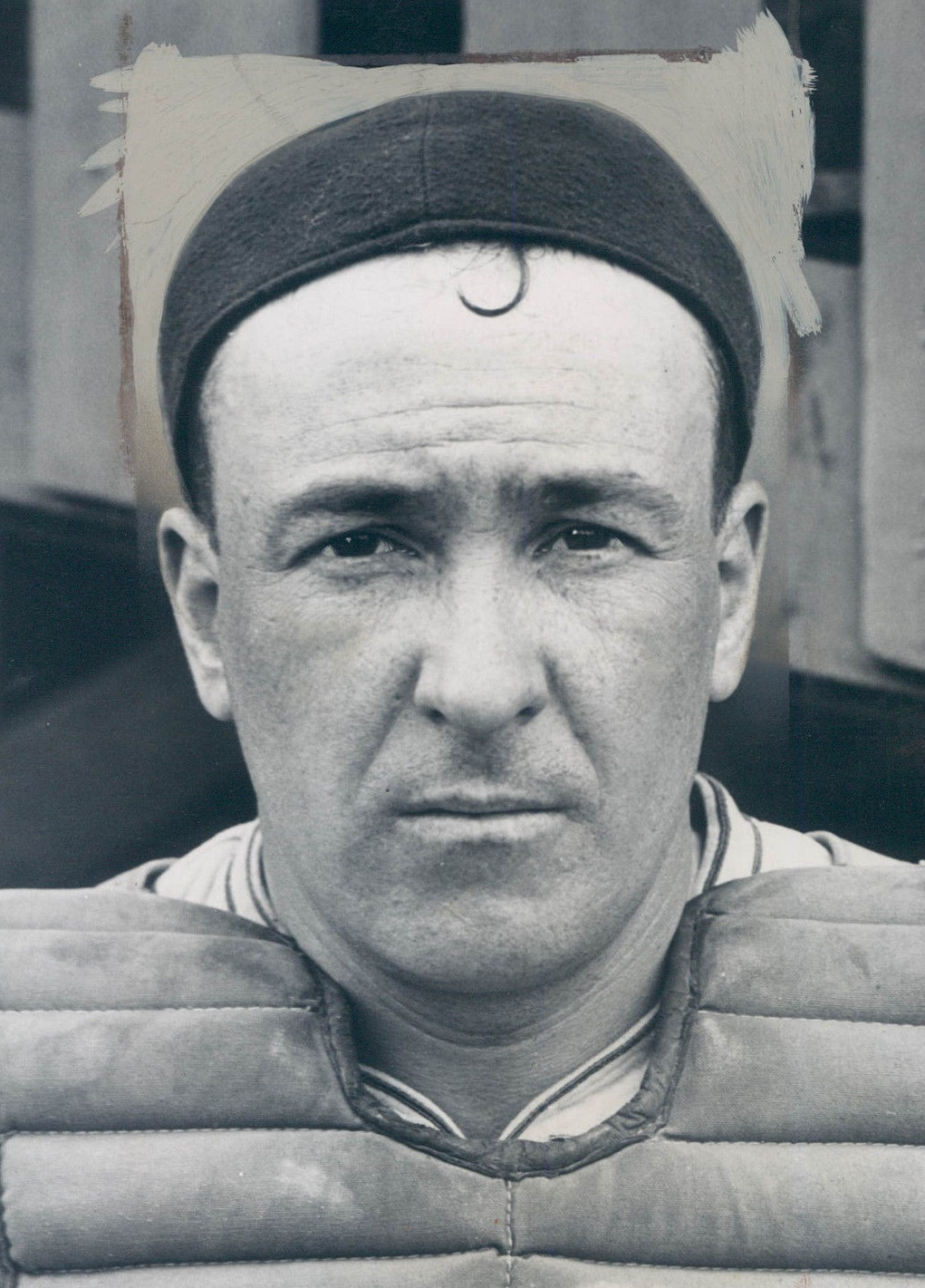
- Todd in 1935
- Catcher
- Born: January 7, 1902; Troy, New York, U.S.
- Died: March 8, 1985 (aged 83); Elmira, New York, U.S.
- Batted: Right Threw: Right

MLB debut
- April 25, 1931, for the Philadelphia Phillies

Last MLB appearance
- August 24, 1943, for the Chicago Cubs

MLB statistics
- Batting average: .276
- Home runs: 35
- Runs batted in: 366
- Stats at Baseball Reference

Teams
- Philadelphia Phillies (1932–1935); Pittsburgh Pirates (1936–1938); Brooklyn Dodgers (1939); Chicago Cubs (1940–1941, 1943)

Alfred Chester Todd (January 7, 1902 – March 8, 1985) was an American professional baseball player, manager and scout. He played as a catcher in Major League Baseball (MLB) from 1932 to 1943 for the Philadelphia Phillies, Pittsburgh Pirates, Brooklyn Dodgers and Chicago Cubs. Todd threw and batted right-handed; he was listed as 6 feet 1 inch (1.85 m) tall and 198 pounds (90 kg).

== Baseball career ==
Todd was a native of Troy, New York. His professional playing career began at the advanced age of 26 in 1928 at the lowest level—then Class D—of minor league baseball. He reached the majors as a 30-year-old rookie in 1932, and spent the next nine full seasons in the big leagues. His best years came in 1937 and 1938 as a member of the Pirates. Todd led all National League catchers in games caught each year, batted .307 and .265 respectively, and drove home 86 and 75 runs batted in.

During the 1938 offseason, Todd was traded to the Boston Bees, then to the Dodgers. In 1939, he platooned with left-handed-hitting Babe Phelps and batted .278 for the Dodgers. He then finished his MLB playing tenure with the Cubs. He was the Cubs' most-used catcher in 1940, starting 98 games, but it was his last full campaign in the major leagues.

== Career statistics ==
In an eleven-year major league career, Todd played in 863 games, accumulating 768 hits in 2,785 at bats for a .276 career batting average along with 35 home runs, 366 runs batted in and a .307 on-base percentage. He posted a .977 career fielding percentage.

== Managing career ==
Todd worked as a minor league manager and scout for several years after his playing career ended. He died on March 8, 1985, at the age of 83 in Elmira, New York.
