= Sioux City Cowboys =

The Sioux City Cowboys were a minor league baseball team that played in the Western League (1934–1937), Nebraska State League (1938) and another incarnation of the Western League (1939). The team, based in Sioux City, Iowa, was affiliated with the Detroit Tigers in 1937 and 1939. It was the first team to be based in Sioux City since 1924. They played at Stockyards Park.

The team made the playoffs in four of its six seasons, reaching the league finals three times and winning the league championship once, in 1939 under managers Pete Monahan and Jimmy Zinn.

== Major league alumni ==
The club featured numerous notable ballplayers. Hall of Famer Dave Bancroft managed the team in 1936.

1934: Hooks Cotter, Guy Curtright, Hal Luby, Art Parks, Biggs Wehde, Hugh Willingham, Icehouse Wilson, Dutch Zwilling (manager)

1935: Luby, Wehde, Willingham

1936: Bancroft (player/manager), Marty Berghammer (manager), Clarence Fieber, Luby, Jug Thesenga

1937: Rube Fischer, Fred Frink, Maury Newlin, Ralph Onis, Steve Rachunok, Thesenga, Ed Weiland, Roger Wolff

1938: Fischer, Wehde

1939: Wehde, Zinn (player/manager)
