= Buchanan Lake (Minnesota) =

Lake in the state of Minnesota, United States

- Location within Minnesota
- Location: Otter Tail County, Minnesota
- Coordinates: 46°26′59″N 95°33′19″W
- Type: Lake
- Surface elevation: 1,325 feet (404 m)

Buchanan Lake is a lake in Otter Tail County, in the U.S. state of Minnesota.

Buchanan Lake was named for James Buchanan, 15th President of the United States.

== See also ==
- List of lakes in Minnesota
