= Norfolk Elk Horns =

- 1922–1924; (1914–1915, 1922–1924, 1928–1941); Norfolk, Nebraska

Minor league affiliations
- Class: Class D (1910–1915, 1922–1924, 1928–1941)
- League: Nebraska State League1914–1915, 1922–1923); Tri-State League (1924); Nebraska State League (1928–1938); Western League (1939–1941)

Major league affiliations
- Team: St. Louis Cardinals (1936); New York Yankees (1937–1941)

Minor league titles
- League titles (2): 1935; 1938
- Conference titles (6): 1922; 1932; 1933; 1939; 1940; 1941

Team data
- Name: Norfolk Drummers (1914-1915); Norfolk Elk Horns (1922–1924); Norfolk Elks (1928–1939); Norfolk Yankees (1940–1941)
- Ballpark: Athletic Park (1914–1915, 1922–1924, 1928–1941)

The Norfolk Elk Horns, Norfolk Elks or the shortened "Elks" was a primary moniker of the minor league baseball teams based in Norfolk, Nebraska between 1914 and 1941. The Norfolk minor league teams played as members of the Class D level Nebraska State League (1914–1915, 1922–1923), Tri-State League (1924), Nebraska State League (1928–1938) and Western League (1939–1941), winning league championships in 1935 and 1938. The Norfolk minor league teams hosted home games at Athletic Park.

The Norfolk Elks were a St. Louis Cardinals minor league affiliate in 1936. Norfolk played as an affiliate of the New York Yankees from 1937 to 1941 and adopted the Norfolk "Yankees" moniker in 1940.

== History ==
=== 1914 to 1924: Nebraska State League / Tri- State League ===
Minor league baseball began in Norfolk, Nebraska in 1914, when the Norfolk "Drummers" became members of the eight–team Class D level Nebraska State League, replacing the Fremont Pathfinders franchise in league play.

At the home opener in 1914, it was noted Mayor Carl Verges threw the first pitch and Prof. Doering and the Battle Creek Band played. Before a reported crowd of 2,000, Norfolk lost to the York Prohibitionists by the score 3–1. At the local Y.M.C.A. bulletin boards were placed at the inside lobby and outside the building to report standings and scored. During away games, Norfolk fans would gather at the boards, waiting for the game score to be called in by phone and updated on the bulletin boards.

Fans yelling profanity in the presence of ladies at Norfolk home games were reprimanded by the police, who were present at games, including Police chief Jolly. A public apology, arrest or a $7.50 fine were all used to punish fans using profanity.

In a 1914 home game against the Beatrice Milkskimmers, it was reported police chief Jolly broke up a fight between Beatrice player Branon and umpire Dixon. According to the Norfolk paper, Branon attacked Dixon, Jolly intervened and arrested Branon. Branon was fined $7.50.

In their first season of play, the 1914 Norfolk Drummers placed sixth in the eight–team Nebraska State League final standings. The drummers ended the season with a record of 52–60, playing under managers Warren Cummings and Babe Towne. With no playoffs held, Norfolk finished 14.0 games behind the first place Grand Island Islanders in the final standings. Pitcher Verne Hirsch of Norfolk led the Nebraska State League with 244 strikeouts.

The Norfolk Drummers continued play in 1914 and folded during the Nebraska State League season. On June 28, 1915, the Drummers folded with a 24–13 record under returning manager Babe Towne. On July 18, 1914, the Nebraska State League folded.

After a seven-season hiatus, the Norfolk Elk Horns won the pennant as the six–team Class D level Nebraska State League reformed in 1922. In June 1922, it was reported the team bought three new Ford automobiles for travel, saving $1,000 over train travel. Norfolk finished the season in 1st place, with a record of 70–48. The Elk Horns finished a mere 0.5 game ahead of the second place Lincoln Links in the final standings. Ernie Adams and Runt Marr served as managers. Norfolk lost in the league Finals as the Fairbury Jeffersons defeated Norfolk 4 games to 3. Norfolk player Claude Mitchell led the Nebraska State League with 21 home runs and player/manager Runt Marr won the batting title with a .364 average on a league leading 167 hits. It was reported that admission to home playoff games was .55 cents and the team enjoyed large crowds for the games. The losers share for the playoff was estimated to be $24.00 per player. After the season, the town held a special dinner for the team at the Merchants Cafe. After the league ended, many of the players stay and barnstormed in the area. They were noted to have played against the town team in Snyder, Nebraska for $500.00.

The Norfolk Elk Horns were the runner–up in the 1923 Nebraska State League. With a final record of 68–66, the team placed second, playing under the direction of manager Ed Reichle. Norfolk finished the season 2.5 games behind the Lincoln Links in the final standings of the six–team league. No playoffs were held.

In 1924, Norfolk briefly played as members of the six–team Class D level Tri-State League. On July 17, 1924, the league folded. Norfolk placed third with a record of 31–30, playing under manager Nig Lane when the league disbanded. Norfolk finished 2.0 games behind the Beatrice Blues and Sioux Falls Canaries who were tied for first place with 35–30 records in the final standings.

=== 1928 to 1938: Nebraska State League ===
The 1928 Norfolk Elks resumed minor league play as the eight–team class D level Nebraska State League reformed. Norfolk would continue play in the league through the 1938 season, as other league franchises relocated or folded during the period. The 1928 Elks ended the season with a record of 55–66, playing under manager Lefty Wilkus. The team placed sixth and ended the season 16.5 games behind the first place McCook Generalsin the final standings as no playoffs were held.

The Norfolk Elks placed seventh in the 1929 Nebraska State League. Playing under returning manager Lefty Wilkus, Norfolk ended the season with a record of 43–73, finishing 31.0 games behind the McCook Generals in the Nebraska State League final standings. John Smith of Norfolk hit 15 home runs to lead the league.

The Norfolk Elks continued play in the 1930 eight–team Nebraska State, placing sixth. Ending the season with a record of 56–65, playing under manager Hal Brokaw, the Elks finished 30.0 games behind the champion McCook Generals in the final standings.

The 1931 Norfolk Elks were managed by Joe McDermott. Norfolk ended the 1931 with a final record of 47–58 to place fifth in the six–team league. Playing under returning manager Joe McDermott, the Elks finished 18.0 games behind the Grand Island Islanders in the final standings of the Nebraska State League. Grand Island won the Finals over the North Platte Buffaloes. Sebastian Wagner of Norfolk hit 22 home runs to lead the Nebraska State League.

The 1932 Norfolk Elks won the Nebraska State League pennant. Playing again under manager Joe McDermott, Norfolk placed first in the regular season standings with a record of 75–35. The Elks finished 13.5 games ahead of the second place Beatrice Blues in the six–team league. Norfolk lost in Finals, as the Beatrice Blues defeated Norfolk 4 games to 3. Norfolk pitcher Otto Davis led the league with 24 wins, while teammate Luke Bucklin had a 1.89 ERA to lead the league. Norfolk player Walt Gannon had 150 total hits, most in the league.

The Norfolk Elks won their second consecutive pennant in the 1933 four–team Nebraska State League regular season. Led by Joe McDermott the Elks finished with a record of 60–45 to place first, just 0.5 game ahead of the second place Beatrice Blues. Norfolk lost in Finals, as the Beatrice Blues won 5 games and the Norfolk Elks 4. Ray Bertram of Norfolk had 156 total hits to lead the Nebraska State League.

1934 Norfolk Elks placed second in the four–team league, as Joe McDermott continued as manager. The Elks ended the season with a record of 60–49, finishing 8.5 games behind the Lincoln Links in the final standings of the Nebraska State League. Pitcher Jack Farmer of Norfolk won 19 games to lead the Nebraska State League, while teammate George Silvey had 143 overall hits, most in the league.

The Norfolk Elks won the 1935 Nebraska State League championship. Norfolk ended the season in second place with a record of 58–49. Managed by Pat Patterson, Norfolk finished 11.5 games behind the first place Sioux Falls Canaries in the final standings of the four–team Class D league. In the finals Norfolk defeated Sioux Falls 4 games to 3 to become league champions. Norfolk's John Grilli had 116 RBI to lead the league and teammate Orie Arntzen had 184 strikeouts to lead the Nebraska State League.

Norfolk Elks continued Nebraska State League play in 1936 and became a minor league affiliate of the St. Louis Cardinals. With Joe McDermott returning as manager, the Elks finished with a record of 63–57 to place third in the six–team league.> The Elks finished 8.0 games behind the Sioux Falls Canaries in the final standings. Norfolk qualified for the playoffs and lost in the first round, as the Mitchell Kernels defeated Norfolk 3 games to 1. Bill A. James led the Nebraska State League with 29 home runs and fellow Norfolk player Dexter Savage paced the league with 128 RBI.

The 1937 Norfolk Elks became a New York Yankees minor league affiliate. Norfolk ended the season with a final record of 50–65, placing fourth in the six–team league and finishing 31.0 games behind the first place Sioux Falls Canaries in the Nebraska State League final standings. Manager Doc Bennett began a four-season tenure as the Norfolk manager.

In Norfolk's final season of Nebraska State League play, the 1938 Norfolk Elks were Nebraska State League champions. Norfolk ended the 1938 with a record of 67–49 to place second, playing under returning manager Doc Bennett. In the regular season standings, Norfolk finished 2.5 games behind the Sioux City Cowboys in the final standings. In the Finals Norfolk defeated Sioux City 4 games to 2 to become league champions. The Nebraska State League folded following the 1938 season. When the league resumed play in 1956, Norfolk did not field a franchise in the league.

=== 1939 to 1941: Western League ===
Continuing as a New York Yankees affiliate, the 1939 Norfolk Elks became members of the six–team Western League and won the league pennant. Playing again under manager Doc Bennett, the Elks ended the season with a record of 75–44 to place first in the regular season standings. Norfolk finished 8.0 games ahead of the second place Sioux Falls Canaries. In the playoffs, Norfolk lost in the first round, as the Sioux City Soos defeated Norfolk 3 games to 2. William Morgan of Norfolk led the league with 17 home runs.

In 1940, the Western League reduced to four teams. The newly named "Norfolk Yankees" continued as an affiliate of the New York Yankees. The Yankees ended the 1940 in first place with a final regular season of 73–39. Norfolk finished 16.0 games ahead of the second place Sioux Falls Canaries, managed again by Doc Bennett. In the Finals, Sioux Falls defeated Norfolk 4 games to 2.

In their final minor league season, Norfolk continued Western League play. The Norfolk Yankees' final season of play saw the franchise win their third consecutive pennant. Norfolk ended the 1941 in first place with a record of 64–44. The Yankees finished 2.0 games ahead of the second place Cheyenne Indians, playing under manager Ray Powell. Frank Bocek led the league with 92 RBI. In the playoffs, Norfolk beat the Sioux City Cowboys 3 games to 2. The Pueblo Rollers won 3 games to Norfolk's 2 as the Yankees lost in Finals. The Western League did not play in the 1942 through 1946 seasons, with World War II interrupting play. When the 1947 Western League reformed, Norfolk did not field a franchise in the league.

Norfolk, Nebraska has not hosted another minor league team.

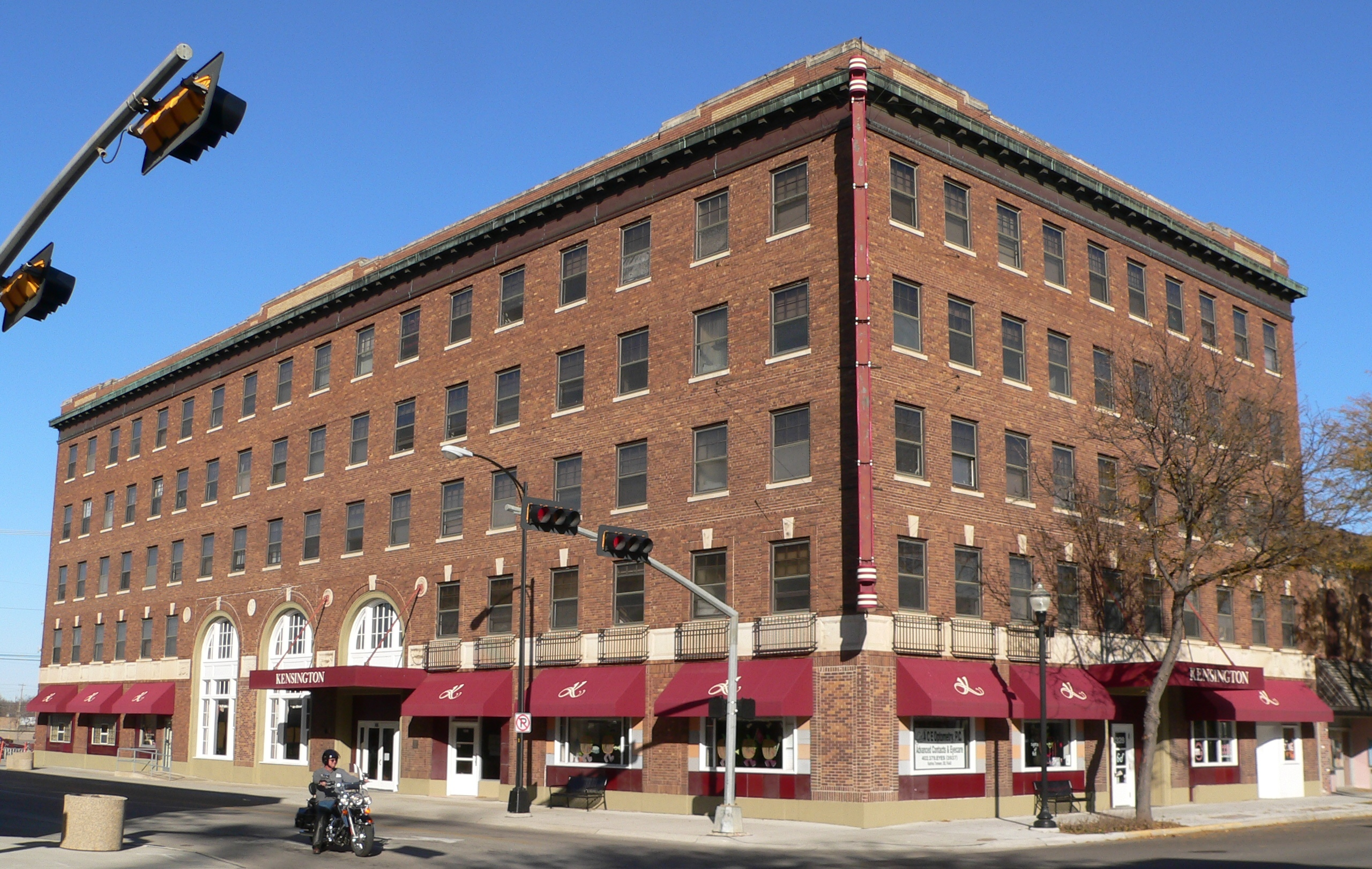
(2009) Kensington Building. National Register of Historic Places. Norfolk, Nebraska.

== The ballpark ==
For their duration, Norfolk minor league teams were noted to have played home minor league games at Athletic Park. In 1922, the facility was rebuilt, with covered wooden grandstands installed behind home plate, bleachers down both foul lines and right field bleachers. The park was also used for the "Harvest Festival" and local fairs. The ballpark was located at North 4th Street & Prospect Avenue, Norfolk, Nebraska.

== Timeline ==
Year(s)	# Yrs.	Team	Level	League	Affiliate	Ballpark
1914–1915	2	Norfolk Drummers	Class D	Nebraska State League	None	Athletic Park
1922–1923	2	Norfolk Elk Horns	Class D	Nebraska State League	None	Athletic Park
1924	1	Norfolk Elk Horns	Class D	Tri-State League	None	Athletic Park
1928–1935	8	Norfolk Elks	Class D	Nebraska State League	None	Athletic Park
1936	1	Norfolk Elks	Class D	Nebraska State League	St. Louis Cardinals	Athletic Park
1937–1938	2	Norfolk Elks	Class D	Nebraska State League	New York Yankees	Athletic Park
1939	1	Norfolk Elks	Class D	Western League	New York Yankees	Athletic Park
1940–1941	2	Norfolk Yankees	Class D	Western League	New York Yankees	Athletic Park

== Year–by–year records ==
Year	Record	Finish	Manager	Playoffs
1914	52–60	6th	Warren Cummings / Babe Towne	No playoffs held
1915	24–13	NA	Babe Towne	Team folded June 28; League folded July 18
1922	70–48	1st	Ernie Adams / Runt Marr	Won pennant Lost league Finals
1923	68–66	2nd	Ed Reichle	No playoffs held
1924	31–30	3rd	Nig Lane	League disbanded July 17
1928	55–66	6th	Lefty Wilkus	No playoffs held
1929	43–73	7th	Lefty Wilkus	No playoffs held
1930	56–65	6th	Hal Brokaw	No playoffs held
1931	47–58	5th	Joe McDermott	Did not qualify
1932	75–35	1st	Joe McDermott	Won pennant Lost in finals
1933	60–45	1st	Joe McDermott	Won pennant Lost in finals
1934	60–49	2nd	Joe McDermott	No playoffs held
1935	58–49	2nd	Pat Patterson	League champions
1936	63–57	3rd	Joe McDermott	Lost 1st round
1937	50–65	4th	Doc Bennett	No playoffs held
1938	67–49	2nd	Doc Bennett	League champions
1939	75–44	1st	Doc Bennett	Won pennant Lost 1st round
1940	73–39	1st	Doc Bennett	Won pennant Lost in finals
1941	64–44	1st	Ray Powell	Won pennant Lost in finals

== Notable alumni ==
- Orie Arntzen (1935)
- Doc Bennett (1937–1940, MGR)
- Jim Dyck (1941)
- Marv Felderman (1936)
- Oris Hockett (1931–1932)
- Johnny Hopp (1936)
- Hugh Luby (1931–1933)
- Runt Marr (1922, MGR)
- Max Marshall (1936)
- Johnny Orr (1938)
- Joe Orrell (1936)
- Ray Powell (1941, MGR)
- By Speece (1922)
- Les Rock (1932)
- Bill Starr (1932)
- Babe Towne (1914–1915, MGR)
- Bennie Warren (1934)

== See also ==
- Norfolk Drummers players
- Norfolk Elks players
- Norfolk Elk Horns players
- Norfolk Yankees players
