= Worthington Cardinals =

- 1939–1940; Worthington, Minnesota

Minor league affiliations
- Class: Class D (1939–1940)
- League: Western League (1939–1940)

Major league affiliations
- Team: St. Louis Cardinals (1939–1940)

Minor league titles
- League titles (0): None

Team data
- Name: Worthington Cardinals (1939–1940)
- Ballpark: Fairgrounds Park (1939–1940)

The Worthington Cardinals were a minor league baseball team based in Worthington, Minnesota. In 1939 and 1940, Worthington played as a member of the Class D level Western League. The Worthington Cardinals were a minor league affiliate of the St. Louis Cardinals.

Worthington hosted home minor league games at Fairgrounds Park.

== History ==
The year before gaining a minor league franchise, Baseball Hall of Fame member Ted Williams played in an exhibition game in Worthington, hitting a long home run in front of a capacity crowd.

Minor league baseball began in Worthington, Minnesota when the 1939 Worthington Cardinals joined the six–team 1939 Class D level Western League as an affiliate of the St. Louis Cardinals. The Western League reformed after not playing in 1938. The Lincoln Links, Mitchell Kernels, Norfolk Elks, Sioux City Cowboys and Sioux Falls Canaries joined Worthington in 1939 league play.

In their first season of play, the 1939 Worthington Cardinals finished last. With a regular season record of 36–81, Worthington placed 6th in the six–team Western League regular season standings, playing under managers Joe McDermott, George Stine and Gerald Burmeister. Worthington finished 38.0 games behind the 1st place Norfolk Elks in the final standings and did not qualify for the four–team playoffs, won by the Sioux City Soos.

In 1940, the Worthington Cardinals played their final minor league season as the Western League reduced to four teams. The Cardinals ended the regular season with a 50–59 record, placing 3rd in the four–team Western League final standings. The 1940 managers were Ray W. Martin and George Payne, as Worthington finished 21.0 games behind the 1st place Norfolk Yankees. In the Finals, the Sioux Falls Canaries defeated Norfolk. Worthington's John A. Lucas led the Western League, with a batting average of.356. Joining Lucas as league All-Stars were teammates Al Dudas, Dale Hackett and Ralph Scheef.

Baseball Hall of Fame member Branch Rickey was the General Manager of the St. Louis Cardinals and had created their extensive system of "farm teams." Rickey visited Worthington games on multiple occasions, scouting and greeting fans.

The Worthington Cardinals franchise permanently folded after the 1940 season, as only the Norfolk franchise returned to the 1941 Western League. Worthington, Minnesota has not hosted another minor league team.

== The ballpark ==
The Worthington Cardinals played home games at Fairgrounds Park. The ballpark at Fairgrounds Park had a capacity of 2,000 and dimensions of (Left, Center, Right) 340–400–340 in 1939. The Nobles County Fairgrounds are still in use today. The fairgrounds are located on Stower Drive, Worthington, Minnesota.

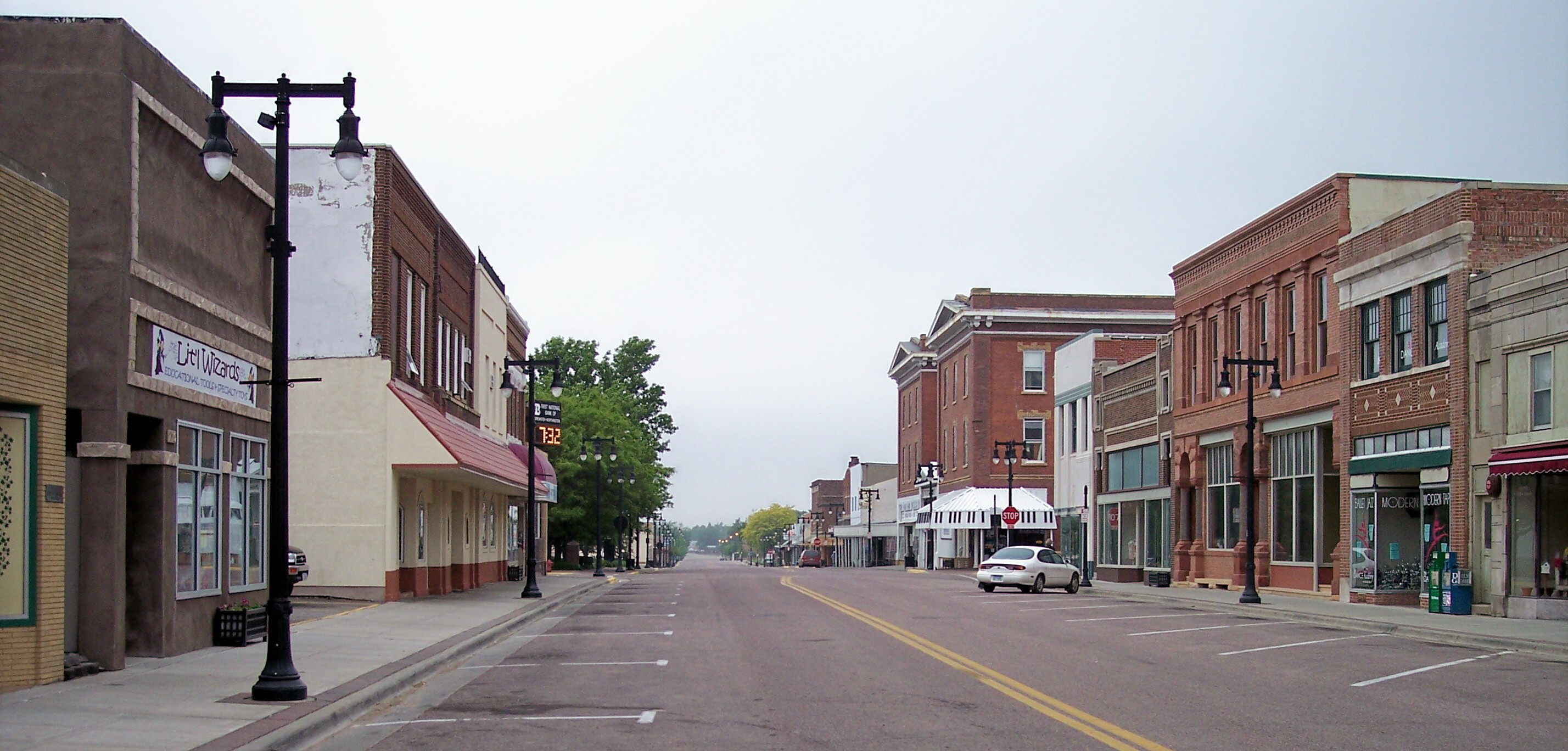
(2007) Worthington, Minnesota

== Timeline ==
Year(s)	# Yrs.	Team	Level	League	Affiliate
1938–1940	2	Worthington Cardinals	Class D	Western League	St. Louis Cardinals

== Season–by–season ==
Year	Record	Manager	Finish	Playoffs/Notes
1939	36–81	Joe McDermott / George Stine / Gerald Burmeister	6th	Did not qualify
1940	50–59	Ray Martin / George Payne	3rd	Did not qualify

== Notable alumni ==
- Al Papai (1940)
- George Payne (1940, MGR)
- Worthington Cardinals players

== External references ==
- Baseball Reference
