= George Payne =

George Payne may refer to:

- George David Payne (1853–1916), Australian architect
- George Payne (Freemason) (1685–1757)
- George Payne (racehorse owner) (1804–1878), English breeder of thoroughbred horses
- George Payne (baseball) (1889–1959), American baseball pitcher and member of the Texas League Hall of Fame
- George Payne (Australian footballer) (1893–1962), Australian rules footballer who played for South Melbourne
- George Payne (footballer, born 1921) (1921–1987), English footballer who played as a goalkeeper for Tranmere Rovers and Northwich Victoria
- George Payne (footballer, born 1887) (1887–1932), former Tottenham Hotspur, Crystal Palace and Sunderland player
- George Payne (cricketer) (1850–1892), English cricketer
- George Payne (actor), American pornographic actor
- George Henry Payne (1876–1945), author and publisher
