= Cy Sherman =

American journalist (1871–1951)

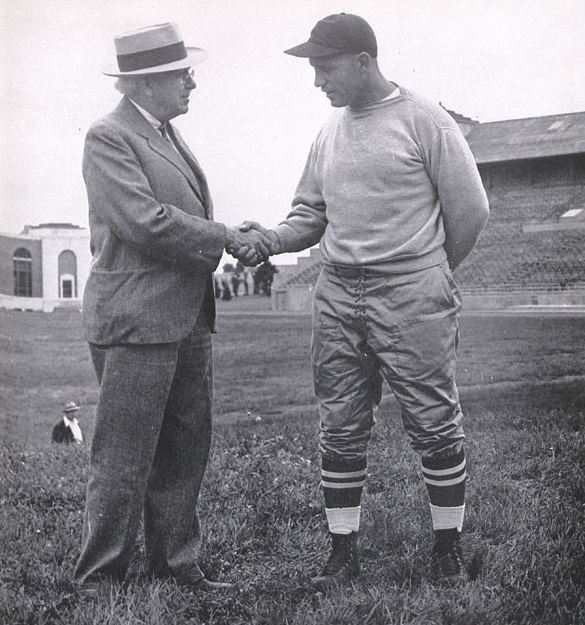
Cy Sherman with Glenn Presnell, c. 1943

Charles Sumner "Cy" Sherman (March 10, 1871 – May 22, 1951) was an American journalist and is known as the "father of the Cornhuskers" after giving the University of Nebraska football team the name "Cornhuskers" in 1899. At his suggestion in 1936, Associated Press (AP) sports editor Alan J. Gould created the first AP Poll for ranking college football teams. Sherman began his career writing at the Nebraska State Journal in Lincoln, spent a short time at the Red Lodge, Montana Pickett before returning to Lincoln and the Lincoln Star where he spent most of his career. At his death he was called by the Star the "Dean of American Sportswriters".

== Early life ==
Charles Sumner Sherman was born in Villisca, Iowa, on March 10, 1871, to Charles Wheelan Sherman and Orilla (Groom) Sherman. His father was a Civil War veteran and newspaper publisher and editor. He was born in Richland County, Ohio, on June 6, 1841, and died in Los Angeles, California, in January 1921. His mother was born in Marion County, Iowa, on August 26, 1842, and died in Plattsmouth, Nebraska, on May 31, 1900. Sherman first attended schools in Glenwood, Iowa, before his family moved to Plattsmouth, where he attended Plattsmouth High School. In Plattsmouth, his father was the publisher of the Plattsmouth Journal, and Sherman spent time in its shop in where he learned printing. Sherman married Nancy Ada Moore in Davenport, Iowa, on August 16, 1893. Nancy was born in Davenport on October 31, 1870.

== Origin of the Cornhusker name ==
During the 1890 through 1899 seasons, the Huskers had been called multiple names including Treeplanters, Rattlesnake Boys, Antelopes, Old Gold Knights and Bugeaters. The school was changing its school colors to scarlet and cream in 1892 and the Old Gold Knights no longer made sense. By 1892, the team's most commonly used nickname was the Bugeaters, possibly named after the insect-devouring bull bats or possibly as a teasing reference to the only food an East Coast reporter believed was left for residents to eat after an 1870s drought. Sherman attended a Thanksgiving 1893 game between Nebraska and the University of Iowa and when he saw the team called the "Bug Eaters" in the papers after the game, he decided the team should have a better name. Sherman thought the name Bugeaters was unglamorous and was tired of referring to the Nebraska teams with that name.

Sherman was writing for the Nebraska State Journal starting in about 1898, and in 1899 was the first to use the name Cornhuskers to refer to Nebraska. He did so frequently in his columns and University journalism professor Alvin Watkins Jr. made a push for its adoption on campus. It was a successful effort and Cornhuskers would become the only used name for the team starting in 1900. The student yearbook changed its name to the “Cornhusker” in 1907. When the Nebraska legislature passed a bill naming Nebraska the Cornhusker State in 1946, Sherman received the pen used to sign the bill.

== Later career ==
=== Red Lodge ===
In August 1913, Sherman moved to Red Lodge, Montana, where he became editor and part owner of the Red Lodge Picket, but returned to Nebraska and in about 1915 and became editor of the Star.

=== Professional wrestling ===
In 1916, Sherman refereed a professional wrestling match in Baltimore, Maryland, between Nebraska's Joe Stecher (who won) and Baltimore's Gus "Americus" Schoenlein for the title of world's heavyweight champion, which had been vacated upon the retirement of the previous title holder, Frank Gotch, who was in the audience. Sherman played a role in advocating Stecher's career, which increased the wrestler's prominence. Later in the year, Sherman was credited with discovering Earl Caddock from Anita, Iowa, after Caddock defeated Mort Henderson. In February 1917, Sherman criticized Jim Londos for wrestling in Nebraska under assumed identities, a tactic known as "ringing in" which meant that gamblers and Londos's small-time Nebraska opponents would not know who they were fighting. Sherman refereed a match between Caddock and Stecher in April 1917 in Omaha. Caddock won the match, and Sherman's work was controversial when he disallowed a fall when Caddock had nearly pinned Stecher but had his feet off the mat.

Later that year Sherman organized athletic shows in Lincoln to raise money to support Lincoln's Western Baseball League team and to support John L. Griffith's cantonment gymnasium fund. At one show Fred Fulton boxed, while Caddock wrestled at the other. Boxers Mike and Tommy Gibbons were also part of the affair.

=== College football and the AP poll ===
In 1935, AP sports editor Alan J. Gould declared a three-way tie for national champion in football between Minnesota, Princeton, and Southern Methodist. Minnesota fans protested, and a number of Gould's colleagues led by Sherman suggested he create a poll of sports editors instead of only using his own list, and the next year the AP Poll began. As a writer, Sherman's column in the Star was for a time called "Brass Tacks". He was known as an advocate for sportsmanship and opposed commercialization and excess recruiting in the college game.

=== Western League Baseball ===
As early as the 1910s, Sherman was involved in minor league baseball in Lincoln. During World War II, the Western Baseball League disbanded and in 1946, Sherman was one of six owners of franchises which organized a reconstituted league which began play in 1947. Sherman's team was the Lincoln Athletics, and they played on a field named for Sherman. In 1947 the president of the league was US Senator from Colorado, Edwin C. Johnson, and Sherman was treasurer. The Lincoln A's disbanded in 1952, the year after Sherman died, and the Western League closed in 1958.

=== Retirement ===
He retired from the Star on July 1, 1946, after nearly 60 years as a sports writer.

== Other activities and death ==
Sherman was active in Lincoln society. He was a member of the Lincoln Chamber of Commerce, the Lincoln University Club and the Nebraskana Society. The “N” Club, usually reserved for Husker letter winners, made Sherman an honorary member in 1933. He also had an honorary lifetime membership in the University of Nebraska Alumni Association and was a member of the Elks.

At his death on May 22, 1951, in Lincoln, he was survived by his wife, Nancy, and three brothers and two sisters. Two of his brothers were also in the printing business. He is buried at Wyuka Cemetery in Lincoln.
