= Western League (1939–1941) =

American minor league baseball league

Western League (1939-1941)
- Most recent season or competition: 1941 Western League season
- Formerly: Nebraska State League
- Classification: Class D (1939–1941)
- Sport: Minor League Baseball
- First season: 1939
- Folded: 1941
- Replaced by: Nebraska State League
- President: J. Roy Carter (1939–1941)
- No. of teams: 9
- Country: United States of America
- Most titles: 1 Sioux City Soos; Sioux Falls Canaries; Pueblo Rollers

The Western League of 1939–1941 was a low-level American circuit in Minor League Baseball. The Class D level league was born when the Nebraska State League changed its identity after the 1938 season. It is not related to the Class A level Western League of 1900–1937 and 1947–1958, a higher-level league that suspended operations during the latter years of the Great Depression through World War II.

The 1939–1941 Western League included teams based in Nebraska, South Dakota, Colorado, Iowa, Minnesota and Wyoming. After the United States entered the war, the league did not return for 1942 and was succeeded by its revived Class A namesake in 1947. The Nebraska State League was revived as a Class D circuit from 1956 to 1959.

== Member clubs ==
- Cheyenne, Wyoming: Cheyenne Indians 1941
- Denver, Colorado: Denver Bears 1941
- Lincoln, Nebraska: Lincoln Links 1939
- Mitchell, South Dakota: Mitchell Kernels 1939–1940
- Norfolk, Nebraska: Norfolk Elks 1939; Norfolk Yankees 1940–1941
- Pueblo, Colorado: Pueblo Rollers 1941
- Sioux City, Iowa: Sioux City Soos 1939-1940; Sioux City Cowboys 1941
- Sioux Falls, South Dakota: Sioux Falls Canaries 1939–1941
- Worthington, Minnesota: Worthington Cardinals 1939–1940

== Standings & statistics ==
1939 Western League

Team Name	W	L	PCT	GB	Managers
Norfolk Elks	75	44	.630	-	Doc Bennett
Sioux Falls Canaries	66	52	.559	8½	Ralph Brandon
Sioux City Soos	63	52	.548	10	Pete Monahan
Lincoln Links	64	55	.538	11	Pug Griffin
Mitchell Kernels	49	69	.415	25½	Red Davis (8/1) / Charles Moglia
Worthington Cardinals	36	81	.308	38	Joe McDermott

Playoffs: Sioux City 3 games, Norfolk 2; Lincoln 3 games, Sioux Falls 2
Finals: Sioux City 4 games, Lincoln 2.

Player statistics
Player	Team	Stat	Tot	Player	Team	Stat	Tot
Howard Conners	Sioux Falls	BA	.365	Ox Miller	Lincoln	W	21
Wendell Finders	Norfolk	Hits	167	Ox Miller	Lincoln	SO	208
Bob Dillinger	Lincoln	Runs	139	Lawrence Kempe	Sioux Falls	ERA	3.02
Ted Kakaloris	Lincoln	RBI	114	Leonard Bobeck	Norfolk	PCT	.864 19-3
William Morgan	Norfolk	HR	17				

1940 Western League - schedule

Team Name	W	L	PCT	GB	Managers
Norfolk Yankees	73	39	.652	-	Doc Bennett
Sioux Falls Canaries	59	58	.504	16½	Robert Fenner
Worthington Cardinals	50	59	.459	21½	Ray Martin / George Payne
Sioux City Soos / Mitchell Kernels	44	70	.386	30	Jimmy Zinn / Ed Grayston

Sioux City moved to Mitchell July 24
League played four quarters: Norfolk won the first, second and fourth quarters, Sioux Falls won the third quarter.
Playoff: Sioux Falls 4 games, Norfolk 2.

Player statistics
Player	Team	Stat	Tot	Player	Team	Stat	Tot
Johnny Lucas	Worthington	BA	.356	Frank Wagner	Sioux Falls	W	17
Leo Bohanan	Sioux Falls	Hits	158	Frank Wagner	Sioux Falls	SO	193
Robert Duby	Norfolk	Runs	112	Fred Whalen	Norfolk	ERA	1.36
Fred Schenk	Norfolk	RBI	97	Fred Whalen	Norfolk	PCT	.786 11-3
Russell Burns	Norfolk	HR	17				

1941 Western League - schedule

Team Name	W	L	PCT	GB	Managers
Norfolk Yankees	64	44	.593	-	Ray Powell
Cheyenne Indians	59	44	.573	2½	John Kerr
Sioux City Cowboys	54	56	.491	11	Richard Tichacek
Pueblo Rollers	52	54	.491	11	Pug Griffin
Sioux Falls Canaries	51	56	.477	12½	Robert Fenner / Tony Koenig
Denver Bears	42	68	.382	23	Cobe Jones

Playoffs: Norfolk 3 games, Sioux City 2; Pueblo 3 games, Cheyenne 1
Finals: Pueblo 3 games, Norfolk 2.

Player statistics
Player	Team	Stat	Tot	Player	Team	Stat	Tot
Bernard Steele	Pueblo	BA	.383	George Milstead	Cheyenne	W	19
Bernard Steele	Pueblo	Hits	158	Robert Bergen	Pueblo	SO	183
Bernard Steele	Pueblo	Runs	88	Frank Wagner	Sioux Falls	ERA	2.15
Frank Bocek	Norfolk	RBI	92	George Milstead	Cheyenne	PCT	.792 19-5
Mel Bergman	Cheyenne	HR	10				
