= Pug Griffin =

American baseball player (1896-1951)

- First baseman / Outfielder
- Born: April 24, 1896; Lincoln, Nebraska, U.S.
- Died: October 12, 1951 (aged 55); Colorado Springs, Colorado, U.S.
- Batted: Right Threw: Right

MLB debut
- July 27, 1917, for the Philadelphia Athletics

Last MLB appearance
- October 2, 1920, for the New York Giants

MLB statistics
- Batting average: .207
- Home runs: 1
- Runs batted in: 3
- Stats at Baseball Reference

Teams
- Philadelphia Athletics (1917); New York Giants (1920)

Francis Arthur "Pug" Griffin (April 24, 1896 – October 12, 1951) was an American Major League Baseball player. He debuted in 1917 for the Philadelphia Athletics, playing mostly as a pinch hitter but also appearing in three games as a first baseman. After spending 1918 in the minor leagues with the Baltimore Orioles and 1919 out of organized baseball, Griffin returned to the majors in 1920 with the New York Giants as an outfielder, appearing in five games.

Griffin continued to play in the minor leagues until 1932. In 1929, he became a player-manager, taking over the Omaha Crickets. He continued to manage on and off in the minors until the year of his death, winning a pair of league championships along the way. Griffin managed the Lincoln Links to the Nebraska State League title in 1934, and guided the Pueblo Rollers to the championship of the Western League in 1941.

== Sources ==
- Career statistics from Baseball Reference · Baseball Reference (Minors) · Retrosheet · Baseball Almanac
