= AP poll =

College sports weekly ranking

Inaugural AP polls
- Div I/FBS football: 1936
- Div I/FCS football: 1978
- Div I men's basketball: 1948–49
- Div I women's basketball: 1976–77

Current AP polls
- FBS football: 2026 season
- FCS football: 2026 season
- Div I men's basketball: 2026–27 season
- Div I women's basketball: 2026–27 season

In American college sports, the Associated Press poll (AP poll) provides weekly rankings of the top 25 NCAA teams in one of three Division I sports: football, men's basketball and women's basketball. The rankings are compiled by polling 62 sportswriters and broadcasters from across the nation. Each voter provides their own ranking of the top 25 teams, and the individual rankings are then combined to produce the national ranking by giving a team 25 points for a first place vote, 24 for a second place vote, and so on down to 1 point for a twenty-fifth place vote. Ballots of the voting members in the AP poll are publicized.

== College football ==
The football poll is released Sundays at 2 pm Eastern time during the season, unless ranked teams have not finished their games.

=== History ===
The AP college football poll's origins go back to the 1930s. The news media began running their own polls of sports writers to determine, by popular opinion, the best college football teams in the country. One of the earliest such polls was conducted by the AP in November 1934.

In 1935, AP sports editor Alan J. Gould declared a three-way tie for national champion in football between Minnesota, Princeton, and Southern Methodist. Minnesota fans protested and a number of Gould's colleagues led by Charles "Cy" Sherman suggested he create a poll of sports editors instead of only using his own list. The next year the weekly AP college football poll was born, and has run continuously from 1936.

Due to the long-standing historical ties between individual college football conferences and high-paying bowl games like the Rose Bowl and Orange Bowl, the NCAA had not held a tournament or championship game to determine the national champion of what is now the highest division, NCAA Division I, Football Bowl Subdivision (the Division I, Football Championship Subdivision and lower divisions do hold championship tournaments). As a result, the public and the media began to acknowledge the leading vote-getter in the final AP poll as the national champion for that season.

While the AP poll currently lists the Top 25 teams in the nation, from 1936 to 1988, the wire service only ranked twenty teams, except from 1961 to 1967, when only ten teams were recognized. The AP expanded to the current 25 teams in 1989.

The AP began conducting a preseason poll in 1950.

At the end of the 1947 season, the AP released an unofficial post-bowl poll which differed from the regular season final poll. Until the 1968 college football season, the final AP poll of the season was released following the end of the regular season, with the lone exception of the 1965 season. In 1964, Alabama was named the national champion in the final AP Poll following the completion of the regular season, but lost in the Orange Bowl to Texas, leaving Arkansas as the only undefeated, untied team after the Razorbacks defeated Nebraska in the Cotton Bowl. In 1965, the AP's decision to wait to crown its champion paid handsomely, as top-ranked Michigan State lost to UCLA in the Rose Bowl, number two Arkansas lost to LSU in the Cotton Bowl, and fourth-ranked Alabama defeated third-ranked Nebraska in the Orange Bowl, vaulting the Crimson Tide to the top of the AP's final poll (Michigan State was named national champion in the final UPI Coaches Poll, which did not conduct a post-bowl poll).

Beginning in 1968, the post bowl game poll became permanent and the AP championship reflected the bowl game results. The UPI did not follow suit with the coaches' poll until the 1974 season.

=== No. 1 vs. No. 2 ===
Through the 2023 season, the number one ranked team has faced the number two ranked team 54 times since the inception of the AP poll in 1936. The number one team has a record of 29–21–2 (.577) against the number two team.

No. 1 vs. No. 2 games
Light blue indicates bowl game
Season	No. 1	Result	No. 2	Site	Event	Ref.
1943	Notre Dame	35–12	Michigan	Michigan Stadium • Ann Arbor, MI	1943 Michigan–Notre Dame football rivalry game	
1943	Notre Dame	14–13	Iowa Pre-Flight	Notre Dame Stadium • Notre Dame, IN		
1944	Army	23–7	Navy	Municipal Stadium • Baltimore	1944 Army–Navy Game	
1945	Army	48–0	Notre Dame	Yankee Stadium • The Bronx	1945 Army–Notre Dame football rivalry game	
1945	Army	32–13	Navy	Philadelphia Municipal Stadium • Philadelphia	1945 Army–Navy Game	
1946	Army	0–0	Notre Dame	Yankee Stadium • Bronx, NY	1946 Army vs. Notre Dame football game	
1962	USC	42–37	Wisconsin	Rose Bowl • Pasadena, CA	1963 Rose Bowl	
1963	Oklahoma	7–28	Texas	Cotton Bowl • Dallas	1963 Red River Shootout game	
1963	Texas	28–6	Navy	Cotton Bowl • Dallas, TX	1964 Cotton Bowl Classic	
1966	Notre Dame	10–10	Michigan State	Spartan Stadium • East Lansing, MI	1966 Notre Dame vs. Michigan State football game	
1968	Purdue	37–22	Notre Dame	Notre Dame Stadium • Notre Dame, IN	1968 Notre Dame–Purdue football rivalry game	
1968	Ohio State	27–16	USC	Rose Bowl • Pasadena, CA	1969 Rose Bowl	
1969	Texas	15–14	Arkansas	Razorback Stadium • Fayetteville, AR	1969 Texas vs. Arkansas football game	
1971	Nebraska	35–31	Oklahoma	Oklahoma Memorial Stadium • Norman, OK	1971 Nebraska vs. Oklahoma football game	
1971	Nebraska	38–6	Alabama	Miami Orange Bowl • Miami, FL	1972 Orange Bowl	
1978	Penn State	7–14	Alabama	Louisiana Superdome • New Orleans, LA	1979 Sugar Bowl	
1981	USC	28–24	Oklahoma	Los Angeles Memorial Coliseum • Los Angeles		
1982	Georgia	23–27	Penn State	Louisiana Superdome • New Orleans, LA	1983 Sugar Bowl	
1985	Iowa	12–10	Michigan	Kinnick Stadium • Iowa City, IA		
1986	Oklahoma	16–28	Miami (FL)	Miami Orange Bowl • Miami, FL		
1986	Miami (FL)	10–14	Penn State	Sun Devil Stadium • Tempe, AZ	1987 Fiesta Bowl	
1987	Nebraska	7–17	Oklahoma	Memorial Stadium • Lincoln, NE	1987 Nebraska–Oklahoma football rivalry game	
1987	Oklahoma	14–20	Miami (FL)	Miami Orange Bowl • Miami, FL	1988 Orange Bowl	
1988	Notre Dame	27–10	USC	Los Angeles Memorial Coliseum • Los Angeles	1988 Notre Dame–USC football rivalry game	
1989	Notre Dame	24–19	Michigan	Michigan Stadium • Ann Arbor, MI	1989 Michigan–Notre Dame football rivalry game	
1991	Florida State	16–17	Miami (FL)	Doak Campbell Stadium • Tallahassee, FL	Wide Right I	
1992	Miami (FL)	13–34	Alabama	Louisiana Superdome • New Orleans, LA	1993 Sugar Bowl (Bowl Coalition National Championship Game)	
1993	Florida State	24–31	Notre Dame	Notre Dame Stadium • Notre Dame, IN	1993 Florida State vs. Notre Dame football game	
1993	Florida State	18–16	Nebraska	Miami Orange Bowl • Miami, FL	1994 Orange Bowl (Bowl Coalition National Championship Game)	
1995	Nebraska	62–24	Florida	Sun Devil Stadium • Tempe, AZ	1996 Fiesta Bowl (Bowl Alliance National Championship Game)	
1996	Florida	21–24	Florida State	Doak Campbell Stadium • Tallahassee, FL	1996 Florida–Florida State football rivalry game	
1998	Tennessee	23–16	Florida State	Sun Devil Stadium • Tempe, AZ	1999 Fiesta Bowl (BCS National Championship Game)	
1999	Florida State	46–29	Virginia Tech	Louisiana Superdome • New Orleans, LA	2000 Sugar Bowl (BCS National Championship Game)	
2002	Miami (FL)	24–31 ^{2OT}	Ohio State	Sun Devil Stadium • Tempe, AZ	2003 Fiesta Bowl (BCS National Championship Game)	
2004	USC	55–19	Oklahoma	Pro Player Stadium • Miami Gardens, FL	2005 Orange Bowl (BCS National Championship Game)	
2005	USC	38–41	Texas	Rose Bowl • Pasadena, CA	2006 Rose Bowl (BCS National Championship Game)	
2006	Ohio State	24–7	Texas	Darrell K Royal–Texas Memorial Stadium • Austin, TX		
2006	Ohio State	42–39	Michigan	Ohio Stadium • Columbus, OH	2006 Michigan vs. Ohio State football game	
2006	Ohio State	14–41	Florida	University of Phoenix Stadium • Glendale, AZ	2007 BCS National Championship Game	
2007	Ohio State	24–38	LSU	Louisiana Superdome • New Orleans, LA	2008 BCS National Championship Game	
2008	Alabama	20–31	Florida	Georgia Dome • Atlanta, GA	2008 SEC Championship Game	
2008	Florida	24–14	Oklahoma	Dolphin Stadium • Miami Gardens, FL	2009 BCS National Championship Game	
2009	Florida	13–32	Alabama	Georgia Dome • Atlanta, GA	2009 SEC Championship Game	
2009	Alabama	37–21	Texas	Rose Bowl • Pasadena, CA	2010 BCS National Championship Game	
2010	Auburn	22–19	Oregon	University of Phoenix Stadium • Glendale, AZ	2011 BCS National Championship Game	
2011	LSU	9–6 ^{OT}	Alabama	Bryant–Denny Stadium • Tuscaloosa, AL	2011 LSU vs. Alabama football game	
2011	LSU	0–21	Alabama	Mercedes–Benz Superdome • New Orleans, LA	2012 BCS National Championship Game	
2012	Notre Dame	14–42	Alabama	Sun Life Stadium • Miami Gardens, FL	2013 BCS National Championship Game	
2013	Florida State	34–31	Auburn	Rose Bowl • Pasadena, CA	2014 BCS National Championship Game	
2015	Clemson	40–45	Alabama	University of Phoenix Stadium • Glendale, AZ	2016 College Football Playoff National Championship	
2018	Alabama	16–44	Clemson	Levi's Stadium • Santa Clara, CA	2019 College Football Playoff National Championship	
2019	LSU	46–41	Alabama	Bryant–Denny Stadium • Tuscaloosa, AL	2019 LSU vs. Alabama football game	
2022	Georgia	27–13	Tennessee (Note: No. 2 tied with Ohio State, however Tennessee received more first-place votes (18) than Ohio State (15))	Sanford Stadium • Athens, GA		
2023	Michigan	34–13	Washington	NRG Stadium • Houston, TX	2024 College Football Playoff National Championship	
2025	Ohio State	10–13	Indiana	Lucas Oil Stadium • Indianapolis, IN	2025 Big Ten Football Championship Game	

=== AP Poll inclusion in the BCS ===
In 1997, the Bowl Championship Series (BCS) was developed to try to unify the poll results by picking two teams for a "real" national championship game. For the first several years the AP Poll factored in the determination of the BCS rankings, along with other factors including the Coaches Poll and computer-based polls. Because of a series of controversies surrounding the BCS, the AP demanded in December 2004, that its poll no longer be used in the BCS rankings, and so the 2004–2005 season was the last season that the AP Poll was used for this purpose.

In the 2003 season, the BCS system broke down when the final BCS standings ranked the University of Southern California (USC) at No. 3 while the two human polls in the system had ranked USC at No. 1. As a result, USC did not play in the BCS' designated national championship game. USC (who had earlier in the season lost in triple-overtime to an unranked Cal, 31–24) went on to decisively defeat No. 4 ranked Michigan in the Rose Bowl, while No. 2 Louisiana State University (LSU) (who had lost to Florida earlier in the season) defeated the No. 1 Oklahoma Sooners (who had lost the Big 12 championship game to Kansas State) in a national title game. As a result, the AP Poll kept USC at No. 1 while the Coaches Poll was contractually obligated to select the winner of the BCS game as the No. 1 team. The resulting split national title was the very problem that the BCS was created to solve, and has been widely considered an embarrassment.

In 2004, a new controversy erupted at the end of the season when Auburn and Utah, who both finished the regular season 12–0, were left out of the BCS title game in favor of Oklahoma who also was 12–0 and had won decisively over Colorado in the Big 12 Championship game. USC went on to a win easily over Oklahoma in the Orange Bowl while Auburn and Utah both won their bowl games, leaving three undefeated teams at the end of the season. Also, in that same year, Texas made up late ground on California (Cal) in the BCS standings and as a result grabbed a high-payout, at-large spot in the Rose Bowl. Previous to that poll, Cal had been ranked ahead of Texas in both human polls and the BCS poll. Going into their final game, the Golden Bears were made aware that while margin of victory did not affect computer rankings, it did affect human polls and just eight voters changing their vote could affect the final standings. Both teams won their game that week, but the Texas coach, Mack Brown, had made a public effort to lobby for his team to be moved higher in the ranking. When the human polls were released, Texas remained behind Cal, but it had closed the gap enough so that the BCS poll (which determines placement) placed Texas above Cal, angering both Cal and its conference, the Pac-10. The final poll positions had been unchanged with Cal at No. 4 AP, No. 4 coaches, and No. 6 computers polls and Texas at No. 6 AP, No. 5 coaches, and No. 4 computer polls. The AP Poll voters were caught in the middle because their vote changes were automatically publicized, while the votes of the Coaches poll were kept confidential. Although there had been a more substantial shift in the votes of the Coaches Poll, the only clear targets for the ire of fanatical fans were the voters in the AP Poll. While officials from both Cal and the Pac-10 called for the coaches' votes to be publicized, the overtures were turned down and did little to solve the problem of AP voters. Cal went on to lose to Texas Tech in the Holiday Bowl. Texas defeated Michigan in the Rose Bowl.

Many members of the press who voted in the AP Poll were upset by the controversy and, at the behest of its members, the AP asked that its poll no longer be used in the BCS rankings. The 2004 season was the last season that the AP Poll was used in the BCS rankings. It was replaced in the BCS equation by the newly created Harris Interactive College Football Poll.

=== Final AP football polls ===
Key

- CH National Champion
- RU National Runner-up
- T4 Top 4 finish
- T8 Top 8 finish
- T16 Top 16 finish
- T25 Top 25 finish

Please note that the exact ranking is shown for each school outside of the national champions and runner-up.

School	Conference	#	T16	T8	T4	T2	CH	36	37	38	39	40	41	42	43	44	45	46	47	48	49	50	51	52	53	54	55	56	57	58	59	60	61	62	63	64	65	66	67	68	69	70	71	72	73	74	75	76	77	78	79	80	81	82	83	84	85	86	87	88	89	90	91	92	93	94	95	96	97	98	99	00	01	02	03	04	05	06	07	08	09	10	11	12	13	14	15	16	17	18	19	20	21	22	23	24	25
Alabama	SEC	63	58	41	24	16	12	4	4	13			20	10			3		6			16		9	13						10	9	CH	5	8	CH	CH	3	8	17			4	7	4	5	3	11	RU	CH	CH	6	7		15		13	9		17	9		5	CH	14	5	21	11			8			11			8			6	CH	10	CH	CH	7	4	CH	RU	CH	RU	8	CH	RU	5	5	17	9
Notre Dame	Independent	61	52	32	20	14	8	8	9	5	13		3	6	CH	9	9	CH	CH	RU	CH			3	RU	4	9		10	17	17					3	9	CH	5	5	5	RU	13	14	CH	6		12	CH	7		9							17	CH	RU	6	13	4	RU		11	19		22		15		17			9	17						4	20		11		11	5	12	5	8	18	14	RU	10
Oklahoma	SEC	63	57	42	26	10	7			4	19							14	16	5	RU	CH	10	4	4	3	CH	CH	4	5	15			8	10				3	11		20	RU	RU	3	CH	CH	5	7	3	3	3	20	16		6	CH	3	3	14		17	16		17							CH	6	5	3	3	22	11	8	5		6	16	15	6		5	5	3	4	7	6	10		15		13
Ohio State	Big Ten	65	61	40	25	14	6		13		15		13	CH		RU	12				6	14		17		CH	5	15	RU	8		8	RU			9				CH	4	5		9	RU	4	4	6	11		4	15	15	12	9	13	14	7			24			18	11	14	6	RU	12	RU				CH	4	20	4	RU	5	9	5	5		3	12	CH	4	6	5	3	3	RU	6	4	10	CH	5
USC	Big Ten	52	41	26	18	10	5			7	3					7	11		8					5		17	13	18			14			CH		10	10		CH	4	3	15	20	CH	8	RU	17	RU	13	RU	RU	11	14	15		10			18	7	8	20				13	12							4	CH	CH	RU	4	3	3	22		6		19	20		3	12			21		12			20
Miami	ACC	35	26	16	12	10	5															15				11	14	6										9														18	8		CH	18	9	RU	CH	RU	CH	3	CH	3	15	6	20	14		20	15	RU	CH	RU	5	11	17				19							20	13			22				18	RU
Nebraska	Big Ten	48	39	24	11	6	4	9	11		18	7										17													6	6	5	6			11	CH	CH	4	7	9	9	9	12	8	9	7	11	3	RU	4	11	5	6	10	11	24	15	14	3	CH	CH	6	RU	19	3	8	8		19		24				14	20	24	25													
Minnesota	Big Ten	15	12	7	4	4	4	CH	5	10		CH	CH	19						16	8							12				CH	6	10																																					18				20																10						
Georgia	SEC	44	37	26	13	6	3						14	RU			18	3		8											5							4		8			7				19	10		16		CH	6	4	4				13	15			17	8					10	14	16	20	22	3	7	7	10	23	RU	13			19	5		9			RU	7	4	7	CH	CH	4	6	6
LSU	SEC	44	38	20	9	6	3	RU	8								15	8			9									CH	3		4	7		7	8			19	10	7	11	11	13									11		15	20	10	5	19								12	13			22	7		RU	16	6	3	CH		17	8	RU	14	14		16	13	18	6	CH			16	12		
Texas	SEC	53	43	24	17	5	3						4	11	14		10	15	5			3		10	11				11		4		3	4	CH	5				3	CH	3	18	3	14	17	6		4	9	12		RU	17	5							12				25	14	23		15	21	12	5	6	12	5	CH	13	10	4	RU			19						9	25	19		25	3	4	12
Michigan	Big Ten	65	53	34	14	5	3			16	20	3	5	9	3	8	6	6	RU	CH	7	9			20	15	12	7								4				12	9	9	6	6	6	3	8	3	9	5	18	4	12		8		RU	8	19	4	7	7	6	5	21	12	17	20	CH	12	5	11	20	9	6	14		8	18				12	24			12	10	14	18			3	3	CH		21
Florida State	ACC	35	29	20	14	5	3																																										14		6	5		13		17	15		RU	3	3	4	4	RU	CH	4	4	3	3	3	CH	5	15	21	11	15	23			21		17	23	10	CH	5	14	8						11	6		
Clemson	ACC	38	26	10	7	5	3				12									11		10	19					19		12	11																		19	6			CH	8	11			17	12	9	12	9	18		23							16			22		21		21		24		22	11	8	15	RU	CH	4	CH	RU	3	14	13	20	14	
Florida	SEC	34	29	16	8	4	3																	15					17	14	19	18									14					15									6	3	5					13	7	10	5	7	RU	CH	4	5	12	10	3		24		12	CH	13	CH	3			9			25	14		7	6	13					
Tennessee	SEC	47	35	21	12	6	2	17		RU	RU	4	18	7		12	14	7			17	4	CH	8				RU	13								7		RU	13	15	4	9	8	19	20											4		14		5	8	14	12	12	22	3	9	7	CH	9		4		15	13		25	12								22	22						6	17	9	
Penn State	Big Ten	46	38	23	11	5	2							19					4	18						20					12	16		9					10	RU	RU	18	5	10	5	7	10		5	4	20	8	3	CH			3	CH			15	11	3		8	RU	13	7	16	17	11			16			3	24		8	9							7	8	17	9			7	13	5	
Auburn	SEC	40	32	15	7	4	2							16											17	13	8		CH	4		13			5					16	20	10	12	5		8					16			14	3	14		6	7	8	6	19			4	9	22	24	11			18		14		RU	14	9	15			CH			RU	22		24	10		14						
Army	American	16	11	8	6	4	2								11	CH	CH	RU	11	6	4	RU			14	7	20		18	3																																						25																						19						21	
Pittsburgh	ACC	21	15	9	6	3	2	3	CH	8																	11	13			20				4												15	CH	8		7	RU	4	10	18						17													19		25					15												13	22			
Michigan State	Big Ten	28	26	14	8	5	1													14	19	8	RU	CH	3		RU	9	3			15	8		9		RU	RU								12				12									8		16	16									7									24		14	11		3	5	6		15				9				
TCU	Big 12	22	17	9	4	3	1	16	16	CH													11				6	14		10	7																																									21		23	25		11	22		7	6	RU	14			3	7		9					RU			25
Colorado	Big 12	20	14	7	4	1	1		17																			20					7								16		3	16			16	16													4	CH	20	13	16	3	5	8					9	20														17								25	
Maryland	Big Ten	18	12	5	3	1	1														14		3	13	CH	8	3																		20	13	13	8		20				20		12	18																11	13	17							23															
Indiana	Big Ten	8	5	3	3	1	1										4	20																					4												19									20																																12				10	CH
Texas A&M	SEC	29	22	10	2	1	1				CH	6	9														17	5	9																	16	11	7		19							6	13	10		20	15	12	7	9	8	15		20	11	23											19		5	18					16		4					8
Syracuse	ACC	16	10	4	2	1	1																	14				8		9	CH	19																											4	13			11	6			19	21	21	25			14																	15						20	
BYU	Big 12	21	13	3	1	1	1																																										20		13	12	13		7	CH	16				22	22	23			18		5					25					16	14	25	12											11	19			13	11
Oregon	Big Ten	22	17	10	7	3	–													9																																														11	18				19	7	RU				12		23	10	11	3	4	RU	9	RU	19				5		22	15	6	3	4
Washington	Big Ten	28	22	11	5	3	–	5				10			12							11									8	6											19						10		11	16	10	7		RU		18			23	5	RU	11				16	18			3	19												25			4	16	13				8	RU		
Navy	American	15	9	7	5	2	–	18					10		4	4	RU									5	18	16	5			4			RU																																									24											18				20						23
Ole Miss	SEC	29	22	10	4	2	–						17						13	15				7		6	10		7	11	RU	RU	5	3	7						8	20	15																			21		16					22		22				13					14	20					17	10						11		9	11	3
Georgia Tech	ACC	24	17	9	3	2	–				16			5	13	13		11	10				5	RU	8		7	4										8				13		20													19					RU							25	9	20	17	24							22	13					8											
UCLA	Big Ten	32	27	14	4	1	–				7			13				4					17	6	5	RU	4										4	5			13			15	12		5	15		14		13		5	17	9	7	14	9	6			19		18				5	8							16								16	10								21			
Wisconsin	Big Ten	26	20	11	3	1	–							3									8	11	15	9			19	7	6			RU																															6					6	4	23				17	15	7	24		16	7	10		22	13	21	9	7		11						
Arkansas	SEC	29	26	10	3	1	–	18	14									16								10					9	7	9	6		RU	3			6	7	11	16				7		3	11	8			9			12	15		12	13									16	17							15				12	5										21				
Iowa	Big Ten	29	19	8	3	1	–				9														9			3	6	RU		3																					18		14	16	10	16	16			18	10				25	18						8	8	8				20	7						9			25	15	16	23		24		17
Stanford	ACC	20	15	7	3	1	–					RU		12									7		19		16														19	8	10						15	17													22	9									16									4	7	7	11		3	12	20								
Arizona State	Big 12	18	14	7	3	1	–																						12													6	8	13	9		RU		18				16	6				4	20									4	14							19			16						21	12										7	
California	ACC	14	12	5	3	1	–		RU	14									15	4	3	5	12							16																	14																8		25											9	25	14																			
Duke	ACC	16	11	4	2	1	–	11	20	3	8	18	RU		7	11	13		19					16	18	14			16			10																																																					23												
SMU	ACC	13	10	4	2	1	–					16							3	10										18								10		14												20	5	RU	12	8																																							22	12	
Utah	Big 12	12	7	2	2	1	–																																																											10									21	4				RU	18					21	17	23			16		12	10			14
Virginia Tech	ACC	20	12	3	1	1	–																			16																																20							22		10	13		23	RU	6	18	18		10	7	19	9	15	10	16	21					16	24								
Iowa Pre-Flight	WWII Military	2	2	2	1	1	–								RU	6																																																																																	
Illinois	Big Ten	14	11	4	2	–	–									15		5				13	4		7						13				3																				10						10	25									24		12						20																	16	
Missouri	SEC	20	11	8	1	–	–				6		7								20										18	5					6			9	6				17					15			19																23	21									4	19		18			5	14									8	22	
Oklahoma State	Big 12	17	12	4	1	–	–										5													19																		14								7			11	11									24											16		13	3		17		20	11	14			20	7		16		
Boise State	Pac-12	14	10	4	1	–	–																																																																			15	16	12		5		11	4	9	8	18		16			22	23	23					8	
Houston	Big 12	16	8	3	1	–	–																																	18	12	19	17		9	19		4		10	5									18	14	10																					18				8						17				22
Oregon State	Pac-12	11	6	3	1	–	–						12															10								8			7	15																																4						21	25	18				20										17			
Cincinnati	Big 12	8	3	3	1	–	–																																																																								17	17	8		25							24	21	8	4				
North Carolina	ACC	17	11	2	1	–	–		19									9	9	3	16																							12					17		15	10	9	18										19	19			10	6																		15					18					
South Carolina	SEC	11	7	2	1	–	–																							15																										11			15													19	13									22	9	8	4									23		19	
Fordham	FCS	6	5	2	1	–	–	15	3	15	17	12	6																																																																																				
Arizona	Big 12	8	4	1	1	–	–																																								18											11			25				10	20				4																19									11		
Cornell	FCS	5	4	1	1	–	–			12	4	15								19	12																																																																												
Tulsa	American	8	3	1	1	–	–							4	15		17	17				18		12																																							21																			24															
Randolph Field	WWII Military	1	1	1	1	–	–									3																																																																																	
Kansas State	Big 12	15	9	4	–	–	–																																																										20	19	7	17	8	10	6	9		7	14								15	12		18								14	18		
West Virginia	Big 12	20	8	4	–	–	–																		10	12	19														17						20						17	19	16					5	21				7									25			5	10	6	23	25		17					18		20							
Northwestern	Big Ten	13	8	4	–	–	–	7		17		8	11		9					7																																															8	15																17			23		17	21		10					
Boston College	ACC	14	6	3	–	–	–				11	5		8																																									19	5		19						21	13	23							21			21	18	20	10																		
Rice	American	7	4	3	–	–	–		18									10	18		5				6	19			8																																																																				
Baylor	Big 12	16	13	2	–	–	–														20		9			18		11				12														14					14	14					17	12																									13		13	7	13				13		5				
Purdue	Big Ten	16	8	2	–	–	–								5									18						13		19						7	9	10	18									13	10	17																	15	24	25	13			18																						
Kentucky	SEC	10	6	2	–	–	–														11	7	15	20	16																							18	6							19																																		12			18				
Penn	FCS	7	6	2	–	–	–	10				14	15		20		8	13	7																																																																														
Louisville	ACC	12	5	2	–	–	–																																					18																		14			24								17			6	19	6						13	15	24		21							19		
Kansas	Big 12	8	5	2	–	–	–												12													11								7					18																			22			9												7																23		
Air Force	Mountain West	7	5	2	–	–	–																							6												16													13		8						25							13																					22						
Tulane	American	9	4	2	–	–	–			19	5									13		20																				17			20																									7																								9			18
Princeton	FCS	4	2	2	–	–	–														18	6	6	19																																																																									
Texas Tech	Big 12	12	6	1	–	–	–			11															12																				11			13													19						23									18	20		22	12	21																7
Santa Clara	Defunct	6	6	1	–	–	–	6	9		14	11		15							15																																																																												
Dartmouth	FCS	5	4	1	–	–	–	13	7	20					16																											14																																																							
UCF	Big 12	5	3	1	–	–	–																																																																											21			10				6	11	24						
Wyoming	Mountain West	4	3	1	–	–	–															12									16								6																													22																													
Duquesne	FCS	3	3	1	–	–	–	14			10		8																																																																																				
Villanova	FCS	3	2	1	–	–	–		6	18											13																																																																												
Bainbridge Naval	WWII Military	2	1	1	–	–	–									5	17																																																																																
Great Lakes Navy	WWII Military	2	1	1	–	–	–								6	17																																																																																	
Carnegie Mellon	D3	1	1	1	–	' –	–			6																																																																																							
Saint Mary's	Defunct	1	1	1	–	–	–										7																																																																																
Del Monte	WWII Military	1	1	1	–	–	–								8																																																																																		
Washington State	Pac-12	12	7	–	–	–	–						19	17									18																					19																16				15		21			9				10	10	9															10							
Mississippi State	SEC	15	6	–	–	–	–					9	16	18															14																	17		20				19												23		24					13	24										15				11			19					20			
Miami (OH)	MAC	5	5	–	–	–	–																				15																		15	10	12																												10																						
NC State	ACC	15	4	–	–	–	–											18	17										15															17	16	11				18													24	17		17								12								25							23				20		21		
Virginia	ACC	10	4	–	–	–	–																13																																	20					18	23				15	16			18				22		23																					16
Yale	FCS	4	4	–	–	–	–	12	12									12														14																																																																	
Holy Cross	FCS	5	3	–	–	–	–		14	9				19			16						19																																																																										
Iowa State	Big 12	4	2	–	–	–	–																																									19																								25																				9				15	
Utah State	Pac-12	4	2	–	–	–	–																										10																																																			16						22			24				
Toledo	MAC	4	2	–	–	–	–																																			12	14																								24						23																								
Vanderbilt	SEC	4	2	–	–	–	–													12																																																																23	24												15
William & Mary	FCS	3	2	–	–	–	–							14					14	17																																																																													
Colorado State	Pac-12	3	2	–	–	–	–																																																											16			17			14																									
March Field	WWII Military	2	2	–	–	–	–								10	10																																																																																	
Louisiana	Sun Belt	2	2	–	–	–	–																																																																																					15	16				
Wake Forest	ACC	5	1	–	–	–	–										19			20																																												25														18															15				
Rutgers	Big Ten	3	1	–	–	–	–																							20																		17																														12																			
Southern Miss	Sun Belt	3	1	–	–	–	–																																																														19		14												20														
Marshall	Sun Belt	3	1	–	–	–	–																																																																10			24												23											
San Diego State	Pac-12	3	1	–	–	–	–																																										16																																							25					25				
East Carolina	American	2	1	–	–	–	–																																																20								9																																		
Pacific	Defunct	2	1	–	–	–	–								19						10																																																																												
Nevada	Mountain West	1	1	–	–	–	–																																																																											11															
Georgetown	FCS	1	1	–	–	–	–					13																																																																																					
Norman	WWII Military	1	1	–	–	–	–									13																																																																																	
Coastal Carolina	Sun Belt	1	1	–	–	–	–																																																																																					14					
San Francisco	Defunct	1	1	–	–	–	–																14																																																																										
Western Michigan	MAC	1	1	–	–	–	–																																																																																	15									
Boston University	Defunct	1	1	–	–	–	–																16																																																																										
El Toro	WWII Military	1	1	–	–	–	–									16																																																																																	
Fresno State	Pac-12	4	–	–	–	–	–																																																									24												22														18				24			
Memphis	American	4	–	–	–	–	–																																																																															25			25		17					24	
Hawaii	Mountain West	2	–	–	–	–	–																																																									20															19																		
Columbia	FCS	2	–	–	–	–	–										20		20																																																																														
South Florida	American	2	–	–	–	–	–																																																																																	19	21								
Liberty	CUSA	2	–	–	–	–	–																																																																																					17			25		
San Jose State	Mountain West	2	–	–	–	–	–																																																																													21								24					
George Washington	Defunct	1	–	–	–	–	–																					17																																																																					
Hardin–Simmons	D3	1	–	–	–	–	–					17																																																																																					
New Mexico State	CUSA	1	–	–	–	–	–																									17																																																																	
Temple	American	1	–	–	–	–	–																																												17																																														
Colorado College	Defunct	1	–	–	–	–	–								18																																																																																		
Fort Pierce	WWII Military	1	–	–	–	–	–									18																																																																																	
Washington and Lee	D3	1	–	–	–	–	–															18																																																																											
Appalachian State	Sun Belt	1	–	–	–	–	–																																																																																				19						
Delaware	CUSA	1	–	–	–	–	–											19																																																																															
James Madison	Sun Belt	1	–	–	–	–	–																																																																																										19
Lafayette	FCS	1	–	–	–	–	–					19																																																																																					
Saint Mary's Navy	WWII Military	1	–	–	–	–	–									19																																																																																	
Troy	Sun Belt	1	–	–	–	–	–																																																																																							19			
Second Air Force	WWII Military	1	–	–	–	–	–									20																																																																																	
Marquette	Defunct	1	–	–	–	–	–	20																																																																																									
Ohio	MAC	1	–	–	–	–	–																																	20																																																									
VMI	FCS	1	–	–	–	–	–																						20																																																																				
Northern Illinois	Mountain West	1	–	–	–	–	–																																																																													22													
Ball State	MAC	1	–	–	–	–	–																																																																																					23					
Bowling Green	MAC	1	–	–	–	–	–																																																																				23																						
Central Michigan	MAC	1	–	–	–	–	–																																																																										23																
UNLV	Mountain West	1	–	–	–	–	–																																																																																									23	
North Texas	American	1	–	–	–	–	–																																																																																										24
Western Kentucky	CUSA	1	–	–	–	–	–																																																																																24										
Buffalo	MAC	1	–	–	–	–	–																																																																																					25					

=== Other media football polls ===
The AP Poll is not the only college football poll. The other major poll is the Coaches Poll, which has been published by several organizations: the United Press (1950–1957), the United Press International (1958–1990), USA Today (1991–present), CNN (1991–1996), and ESPN (1997–2005). Having two major polls has led to numerous "split" national titles, where the two polls disagreed on the No. 1 team. This has occurred on eleven different occasions (1954, 1957, 1965, 1970, 1973, 1974, 1978, 1990, 1991, 1997, 2003).

== College basketball ==
In Division I men's and women's college basketball, the AP Poll is largely just a tool to compare schools throughout the season and spark debate, as it has no bearing on postseason play. Generally, all top 25 teams in the poll are invited to the men's and women's NCAA basketball tournament, also known as March Madness. The poll is usually released every Monday and voters' ballots are publicized.

=== Men's basketball ===
The AP began compiling a ranking of the top 20 college men's basketball teams during the 1948–1949 season. It has issued this poll continuously since the 1950–1951 season. Beginning with the 1989-1990 season, the poll expanded to 25 teams. Kentucky has the highest % of AP poll top 25 appearances, top 10 appearances, top 5 appearances, as well as preseason and end of season appearances. Kentucky has appeared in over 75% of the AP polls since the 1948–49 season.

On January 10, 2024, the Associated Press published an article detailing their 75th anniversary of the AP poll for men's college basketball. In this article they highlight the most successful programs in terms of rankings released by the AP during the previous 75 years. The top 5 programs in order are #1 Kentucky, #2 North Carolina, #3 Duke, #4 Kansas, and #5 UCLA.

=== Women's basketball ===
The women's basketball poll began during the 1976–1977 season, and was initially compiled by Mel Greenberg and published by The Philadelphia Inquirer. At first, it was a poll of coaches conducted via telephone, where coaches identified top teams and a list of the Top 20 team was produced. The initial list of coaches did not include Pat Summitt, who asked to join the group, not to improve her rankings, but because of the lack of media coverage. Summitt believed it would be a good way to stay on top of who the top teams were outside of her own schedule. The poll continued to be a top 20 poll through 1989. The number was increased to 25 in 1990 and subsequent years.

The contributors continued to be coaches until 1994, when the AP took over administration of the poll from Greenberg, and switched to a panel of writers. In 1994, Tennessee started out as No. 1 in the polls with Connecticut at No. 4. After losses by the No. 2 and No. 3 teams, Tennessee and Connecticut were ranked No. 1 and No. 2, headed into a showdown, scheduled as a special event on Martin Luther King day, the only women's basketball game scheduled on that day. Because of the unusual circumstances, the decision was made to hold off the AP voting for one day, to ensure it would be after the game. Connecticut won the game, and moved into first place in the AP poll, published on Tuesday for the only time. (Connecticut went on to complete an undefeated season.) Over the history of the poll, over 255 coaches have had a team represented in polls.

== NFL football ==
Beginning in 2012, the AP began issuing a weekly pro football ranking, the AP Pro32 rankings.

== See also ==
- 2025 NCAA Division I FBS football rankings
- Bowl Championship Series
- Coaches' Poll
- College football national championships in NCAA Division I FBS
- College Football Playoff
- Dickinson System
- Game of the Century (college football)
- Grantland Rice Award
- Harris Interactive College Football Poll
- List of college football teams by weekly appearances atop AP Poll
- List of NCAA college football rankings
- Mythical national championship
- NAIA Coach's Poll
