= 1976–77 AIAW Division I women's basketball rankings =

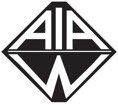
- Season: 1976–77
- AIAW Tournament: 1977
- Preseason No. 1: Delta State
- AIAW Tournament Champions: Delta State
AIAW Division I women's basketball rankings
1977–78 →

A single human poll represents the 1976–77 AIAW Division I women's basketball rankings, the AP Poll, in addition to various publications' preseason polls. The women's basketball poll began during the 1976–1977 season, and was initially compiled by Mel Greenberg and published by The Philadelphia Inquirer. At first, it was a poll of coaches conducted via telephone, where coaches identified top teams and a list of the Top 20 team was produced. The initial list of coaches did not include Pat Summitt, who asked to join the group, not to improve her rankings, but because of the lack of media coverage, Summitt believed it would be a good way to stay on top of who the top teams were outside of her schedule. The contributors continued to be coaches until 1994, when the AP took over administration of the poll from Greenberg, and switched to a panel of writers.

The AP poll is currently a poll of sportswriters. The AP conducts polls weekly through the end of the regular season and conference play.

== Legend ==
–	Not ranked
(#)	Ranking

== AP Poll ==
Team	25-Nov	8-Dec	15-Dec	22-Dec	12-Jan	19-Jan	26-Jan	2-Feb	9-Mar	16-Mar
Delta St.	1	2	1	3	3	2	1	2	1	1
Immaculata	3	3	4	2	2	3	3	3	2	2
Saint Joseph’s	–	–	14	13	11	10	11	10	9	3
Cal St. Fullerton	5	5	6	8	5	5	5	5	11	4
Tennessee	–	17	19	16	13	12	10	12	10	5
Tennessee Tech	4	7	12	6	6	6	6	6	7	6
Wayland Baptist	2	1	2	1	1	1	2	1	4	7
Montclair St.	8	8	8	10	7	7	7	7	3	8
Stephen F. Austin	12	12	5	4	4	4	4	4	5	9
North Carolina St.	–	–	18	17	16	15	14	9	8	10
LSU	–	–	–	–	–	–	–	–	–	11
Baylor	13	13	13	12	15	16	17	19	–	12
UCLA	11	9	7	7	10	9	8	8	6	13
Old Dominion	20	–	–	–	17	18	16	16	12	14
Southeastern La.	–	–	–	–	–	–	–	15	14	15
Maryland	15	16	15	14	12	13	12	13	13	16
Michigan St.	–	–	–	–	–	–	–	–	–	17
Mississippi Col.	10	10	9	9	8	11	18	–	–	18
Southern Conn. St.	14	15	16	–	–	–	–	–	20	19
Kansas St.	19	–	–	19	–	–	–	–	–	20
Illinois St.	16	–	–	–	–	20	20	–	–	–
Indiana St.	–	18	20	20	–	–	–	–	–	–
Kentucky	–	19	17	18	19	19	19	–	–	–
Long Beach St.	18	20	–	–	–	–	–	–	–	–
Memphis	–	–	–	–	18	17	15	18	16	–
Mercer	6	14	–	–	–	–	–	–	–	–
Ole Miss	–	–	–	–	–	–	–	14	–	–
Queens (NY)	9	11	10	15	20	–	–	–	–	–
Texas	–	–	–	–	14	14	13	17	18	–
UNLV	17	4	3	5	9	8	9	11	15	–
Valdosta St.	–	–	–	–	–	–	–	–	19	–
William Penn	7	6	11	11	–	–	–	20	17	–
