= George Payne (Australian footballer) =

Australian rules footballer

Personal information
- Full name: George Frederick Payne
- Born: 28 November 1893; South Melbourne, Victoria
- Died: 21 November 1962 (aged 68); East Melbourne, Victoria
- Height: 185 cm (6 ft 1 in)
- Weight: 81 kg (179 lb)

Playing career^{1}
Years	Club	Games (Goals)
1914–15, 1917	South Melbourne	26 (14)
- ^{1} Playing statistics correct to the end of 1917.

George Frederick Payne (28 November 1893 – 21 November 1962) was an Australian rules footballer who played with South Melbourne in the Victorian Football League (VFL).
