= Runt Marr =

Clifton Ambrose Marr (November 23, 1891 – August 1, 1981, in Grove, Oklahoma, United States) was a baseball figure who spent many years playing, managing and scouting at the minor and major league levels.

Marr played in the minor leagues from 1912 to 1916, from 1918 to 1928, from 1931 to 1932 and in 1937, a total of 19 seasons. Despite playing so long, he never reached the major leagues. His statistical record is incomplete, however it is known that he collected at least 1,939 hits, of which at least 361 were doubles, 85 were triples and 88 were home runs. He hit at least ten home runs four years in a row (1921-1924), with a career-high of 19 in 1924. Perhaps his best season was 1922, when he hit .347 with 44 doubles, 14 triples and 17 home runs for the Norfolk Elk Horns and Sioux City Packers.

Marr managed in at least part of 15 seasons. He skippered the Norfolk Elk Horns (1922), Springfield Midgets (1923), Fort Smith Twins (1924, 1927-1928, 1930-1932), Vicksburg Hill Billies (1925), Raleigh Capitals (1926), Joplin Miners (1933, 1935), Springfield Cardinals (1942), Lima Red Birds (1944) and Johnson City Cardinals (1945). He led the Fort Smith Twins to a league championship in 1927.

Following his managerial career, Marr served as a St. Louis Cardinals scout, signing Cloyd Boyer and Ken Boyer. He was also the first scout to contact Mickey Mantle. Aside from the Cardinals, Marr scouted for the Detroit Tigers, Cleveland Indians, Kansas City Athletics, and New York Mets.

In 1953, he was inducted into the Kansas Baseball Hall of Fame.
