= By Speece =

American baseball player (1897–1974)

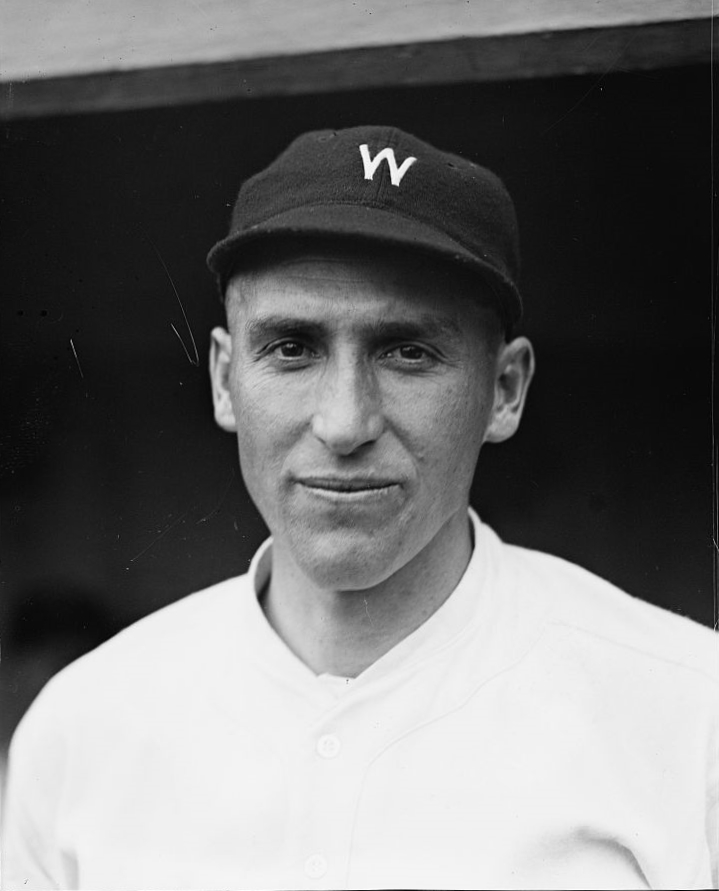
- Pitcher
- Born: January 6, 1897; West Baden, Indiana, U.S.
- Died: September 29, 1974 (aged 77); Elgin, Oregon, U.S.
- Batted: Right Threw: Right

MLB debut
- April 21, 1924, for the Washington Senators

Last MLB appearance
- June 26, 1930, for the Philadelphia Phillies

MLB statistics
- Win–loss record: 5–6
- Earned run average: 4.73
- Strikeouts: 53
- Stats at Baseball Reference

Teams
- As player: Washington Senators (1924); Cleveland Indians (1925–1926); Philadelphia Phillies (1930)

Career highlights and awards
- World Series champion (1924)

Byron Franklin Speece (January 6, 1897 – September 29, 1974) was an American Major League Baseball player. He was married to Helen Grace (née' Whittinghill) Speece; they had two children (Byron Jr. and Wilma Irene).

== Baseball career ==
His minor league career stretched 20 years and he won 241 games.

Speece began as a pitcher with the Norfolk Elkhorns of the Nebraska State League in 1922. He went 14–9, helping Norfolk capture the league championship. His skill as a pitcher attracted the attention of Barney Burch, manager of the Omaha Buffaloes.

Speece pitched for Omaha in 1923 and managed a 26–14 record in 49 games. On May 2, he set a Western League record for pitchers by hitting two home runs in one game. According to the Omaha papers, he was sold for $15,000 to the Washington Senators.

In 1924, he played for the Washington Senators. He played for the Cleveland Indians in 1925 and the first part of 1926. He was sent to the Indianapolis Indians for the remainder of 1926 where he compiled a 17–10 record.

He played for Indianapolis and the Toledo Mud Hens in 1927 and had a 12–10 record.

He was back in Indianapolis in 1928 and 1929 where he was 1–4 and 9–2 respectively.

By 1930, he was back in the majors with the Philadelphia Phillies but spent a lot of the season with the Newark Bears where he was 3–4. He remained in Newark for the 1931 and the first part of the 1932 season.

He played for the Nashville Vols from 1932 through the 1938 season. His best year was 1936 when he had a 22–9 record.

From 1940 through the 1945 season, he was in the Pacific Coast League. He spent three years with the Portland Beavers and three years with the Seattle Rainiers. He was 48 years old during his last year of professional baseball.

By the time he retired; he had pitched in 62 major league games and 673 minor league games.
