= Johnny Orr (basketball, born 1918) =

American basketball player

Personal information
- Born: June 4, 1918 Chicago, Illinois, U.S.
- Died: July 12, 1982 (aged 64) Tucson, Arizona, U.S.
- Listed height: 6 ft 0 in (1.83 m)
- Listed weight: 185 lb (84 kg)

Career information
- High school: St. Rita (Chicago, Illinois)
- College: Benedictine (1937–1938)
- Playing career: 1942–1946
- Position: Guard

Career history
- 1942–1943: Chicago Studebaker Flyers
- 1943–1944: Sheboygan Red Skins
- 1944–1946: Chicago American Gears

John Edward Orr (June 4, 1918 – July 12, 1982) was an American professional basketball and semi-professional baseball player during the 1940s. He played in the National Basketball League for four seasons as well as in the New York Yankees' baseball farm leagues for four seasons.

A native of Chicago, Illinois, Orr was a multi-sport star at St. Rita of Cascia High School. After playing one season of college basketball, Orr signed a contract to play baseball in the Yankees' farm system, this ending his collegiate eligibility. He was a pitcher. Orr played baseball for the Norfolk Elks (1938), Akron Yankees and Norfolk Tars (1939), Joplin Miners, Akron Yankees, and Norfolk Tars (1940), and the Akron Yankees and Columbus Red Birds (1941).

In the National Basketball League, Orr competed as a guard for the Chicago Studebaker Flyers (1942–43), Sheboygan Red Skins (1943–44), and Chicago American Gears (1944–46). In his lone season with the Red Skins, the team lost the NBL championship to the Fort Wayne Zollner Pistons and finished second in the league.
