= Alan J. Gould =

American newspaper writer and editor (1898–1993)

- Born: January 30, 1898; Philadelphia, Pennsylvania, United States
- Died: June 21, 1993 (aged 95); Vero Beach, Florida
- Occupation: Newspaper editor for the Associated Press

Alan Jenks Gould (January 30, 1898 – June 21, 1993) was an American newspaper writer and editor. He was the sports editor of the Associated Press from 1922 to 1938 and the executive editor of the Associated Press from 1941 to 1963.

== Early years ==
While still in high school, Gould was hired by Frank Gannett (founder of Gannett media corporation) as a part-time reporter for the Star Gazette in Elmira, New York. He also worked for a time at Gannett's Ithaca Journal. He next became the news editor of the Morning Sun in Binghamton, New York.

== Associated Press sports editor ==
Gould went to work for the Associated Press in 1922. He served as the wire service's sports editor from 1922 to 1938. Gould was an innovator during his time in charge of sports at the Associated Press. For many years, Walter Camp had been the "official" selector of college football's annual All-America team. Controversy had for years surrounded the selection of an All-America team by one man. After Camp died in March 1925, Gould created the Associated Press All-America team. In announcing the first Associated Press All-America team, Gould wrote that the team was a "comprehensive consensus" based on input from 100 coaches and critics from around the country. In 1933, Gould was the first to coin the term "Grand Slam" in respect to winning the four major tennis titles in a calendar year. In 1936, Gould brought another innovation to the sport with the introduction of the AP Poll to rank the country's college football teams and determine a national champion. He polled the editors of AP newspapers to determine the rankings. Gould later recalled, "It was a case of thinking up ideas to develop interest and controversy. Papers wanted material to fill space between games. That's all I had in mind, something to keep the pot boiling. Sports was then living off controversy, opinion, whatever. This was just another exercise in hoopla." The AP Poll quickly became the standard for determining each year's national championship team.

== Associated Press executive editor ==
From 1938 to 1941, Gould was the executive aide in charge of Associated Press personnel.

In December 1941, Gould took over editorial responsibility for the Associated Press news and newsphoto services. He became an assistant general manager of the Associated Press in 1943 and was appointed as the executive editor in May 1948. He was in charge of the wire service's news operations throughout World War II and traveled to England from January to March 1944 to coordinate coverage for the anticipated Allied invasion of the European mainland. On his return to the United States, Gould reported that Gen. Dwight Eisenhower was doing a "remarkable job" coordinating the British and American forces and that any invasion would be "covered by the one of the biggest concentrations of foreign correspondents ever assembled."

During Gould's tenure as executive editor, the Associated Press won 14 Pulitzer Prizes.

Gould retired as the executive editor of the Associated Press on his 65th birthday in January 1963. In May 1963, Gould was honored by Sigma Delta Chi, the professional journalism fraternity, with the designation as a fellow.

== Family and later years ==
Gould was married to Mary Denton Gould in October 1920 at Elmira, New York. They had two children, Alan J. Gould, Jr., and Mary Ann (Gould) Houseman. His first wife died after undergoing surgery for lung cancer in 1966. He was remarried to Mary Sliter Gould; she died in 1976.

Gould moved to Florida in 1975. He died in June 1993 at the Indian River Memorial Hospital in Vero Beach, Florida. He was 95 years old at the time of his death. He was survived by his two children and by his third wife, Catherine.
