= George Payne (baseball) =

American baseball player (1889–1959)

- Pitcher
- Born: May 23, 1889; Mount Vernon, Kentucky, U.S.
- Died: January 24, 1959 (aged 69); Long Beach, California, U.S.
- Batted: Right Threw: Right

MLB debut
- May 8, 1920, for the Chicago White Sox

Last MLB appearance
- October 3, 1920, for the Chicago White Sox

MLB statistics
- Win–loss record: 1-1
- Strikeouts: 7
- Earned run average: 5.46
- Stats at Baseball Reference

Teams
- Chicago White Sox (1920)

For other articles titled George Payne, see George Payne (disambiguation).

George Washington Payne (May 23, 1889 – January 24, 1959) was an American Major League Baseball pitcher. He pitched in sixteen games, all as a relief pitcher, in 1920 for the Chicago White Sox.

Payne had a long career in the minor leagues, spanning twenty-eight years. His professional career began in 1913, when he appeared in one game for the Charleston Sea Gulls of the South Atlantic League. His final year came in 1940, when he managed and pitched in nine games for the Worthington Cardinals of the class-D Western League at the age of 51.

Payne was elected to the Texas League Hall of Fame in 2006. He pitched in the Texas League for the Wichita Falls Spudders (1927–1929) and Houston Buffaloes (1930–1934). He won 20 games three times in eight seasons, including a 28-win season in 1929.
