= George Payne (cricketer) =

English cricketer

Personal information
- Full name: George Spencer Payne
- Born: 25 March 1850; East Grinstead, Sussex, England
- Died: 17 July 1892 (aged 42); East Grinstead, Sussex, England

Domestic team information
- Years: Team
- 1869: Sussex

Career statistics
Competition	First-class
Matches	1
Runs scored	4
Batting average	2.00
100s/50s	0/0
Top score	4
Balls bowled	16
Wickets	0
Bowling average	–
5 wickets in innings	–
10 wickets in match	–
Best bowling	–
Catches/stumpings	1/–
- Source: Cricinfo, 17 June 2012

George Spencer Payne (25 March 1850 – 17 July 1892) was an English cricketer. He was born at East Grinstead, Sussex.

Payne made a single first-class appearance for Sussex against Kent in 1869 at the Higher Common Ground, Tunbridge Wells. Kent won the toss and elected to bat first, making 116 all out. In response, Sussex made 152 all out in their first-innings, with Payne being run out during it for a duck. Kent then made an improved 304 all out in their second-innings, during which Payne bowled four wicketless overs, to set Sussex 268 for victory. However, Sussex failed in their chase and were dismissed for just 118, with Payne being dismissed for 4 runs by George Bennett. This was his only major appearance for Sussex.

He died at the town of his birth on 25 June 1892.
