= Les Rock =

American baseball player (1912–1991)

- First baseman
- Born: August 19, 1912; Springfield, Minnesota, U.S.
- Died: September 9, 1991 (aged 79); Davis, California, U.S.
- Batted: Left Threw: Right

MLB debut
- September 11, 1936, for the Chicago White Sox

Last MLB appearance
- September 23, 1936, for the Chicago White Sox

MLB statistics
- Games played: 2
- At bats: 1
- Hits: 0
- Stats at Baseball Reference

Teams
- Chicago White Sox (1936)

Lester Henry Rock (born Lester Henry Schwarzrock; August 19, 1912 – September 9, 1991) was an American professional baseball first baseman in Major League Baseball. He played for the Chicago White Sox in 1936.
