= Norfolk Yankees =

American baseball team

The Norfolk Yankees were a Western League baseball team based in Norfolk, Nebraska, United States that played from 1940 to 1941. They were affiliated with the New York Yankees.

Jim Dyck, who played Major League Baseball from 1951 to 1956, is the only known major leaguer to play for the team.
