= Orie Arntzen =

American baseball player (1909–1970)

Orie Edgar Arntzen
- Pitcher
- Born: October 18, 1909; Beverly, Illinois, U.S.
- Died: January 28, 1970 (aged 60); Cedar Rapids, Iowa, U.S.
- Batted: Right Threw: Right

MLB debut
- April 20, 1943, for the Philadelphia Athletics

Last MLB appearance
- September 26, 1943, for the Philadelphia Athletics

MLB statistics
- Win–loss record: 4–13
- Earned run average: 4.22
- Strikeouts: 66
- Stats at Baseball Reference

Teams
- Philadelphia Athletics (1943)

Orie Edgar Arntzen (October 18, 1909 – January 28, 1970) was an American professional baseball pitcher. He played in Major League Baseball (MLB) for the Philadelphia Athletics in 1943. Listed at 6 feet 1 inch (1.85 m) and 200 pounds (91 kg), he threw and batted right-handed.

== Biography ==
Arntzen played in Minor League Baseball between 1933 and 1952; records for several of his seasons are incomplete. For seasons with records available, he had a win–loss record of 192–93, including a 25-win season with the Albany Senators of the Eastern League in 1949. His performance was recognized with The Sporting News Minor League Player of the Year Award. He pitched for farm teams of the St. Louis Cardinals, Cleveland Indians, Philadelphia Athletics, and Pittsburgh Pirates.

Arntzen's only season in Major League Baseball was 1943, when he appeared in 32 games (20 starts) for the Athletics. In 164 1/3 innings pitched, he struck out 66 batters while compiling a 4–13 record with a 4.22 earned run average. As a batter, he had eight hits in 50 at bats for a .160 batting average. In late September, he was traded to the Pirates for fellow pitcher Luke Hamlin, but would not pitch in MLB again.

Nicknamed "Old Folks", Arntzen died in 1970, aged 60, reportedly of a heart attack after being ill with kidney issues.
