= Babe Towne =

American baseball player (1880–1938)

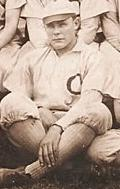
- Catcher
- Born: March 12, 1880; Coon Rapids, Iowa, U.S.
- Died: October 29, 1938 (aged 58); Des Moines, Iowa, U.S.
- Batted: Right Threw: Right

MLB debut
- August 1, 1906, for the Chicago White Sox

Last MLB appearance
- October 6, 1906, for the Chicago White Sox

MLB statistics
- Batting average: .278
- Home runs: 0
- Runs batted in: 6
- Stats at Baseball Reference

Teams
- Chicago White Sox (1906)

Career highlights and awards
- World Series champion (1906)

Jay King "Babe" Towne (March 12, 1880 – October 29, 1938) was an American catcher in Major League Baseball.

Towne began his professional baseball career in 1902 with the Class D Rock Rapids Browns. From 1903 to 1906, he played for Des Moines of the Class A Western League. In July 1906, Towne was batting .357 when he was purchased by the Chicago White Sox. He played in 14 games and also pinch-hit once in the 1906 World Series, which the White Sox won.

Towne returned to the minor leagues the following year. From 1909 to 1912, he played for the Western League's Sioux City Packers, managing the team in 1910 and 1911. He batted .333 in 73 games for the 1910 team, which he also managed to 108 wins and the pennant.

He ended his playing and managing career in 1916 in the Central Association.

Towne was born in Coon Rapids, Iowa, and died in Des Moines, Iowa.
