= Max Marshall (baseball) =

American baseball player (1913–1993)

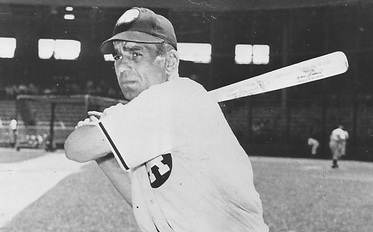
- Right fielder
- Born: September 18, 1913; Randolph, Iowa, U.S.
- Died: September 16, 1993 (aged 79); Salem, Oregon, U.S.
- Batted: Left Threw: Right

MLB debut
- May 10, 1942, for the Cincinnati Reds

Last MLB appearance
- July 26, 1944, for the Cincinnati Reds

MLB statistics
- Batting average: .245
- Home runs: 15
- Runs batted in: 105
- Stats at Baseball Reference

Teams
- Cincinnati Reds (1942–44)

Milo May "Max" Marshall (September 18, 1913 – September 16, 1993) was an American professional baseball outfielder. He played three seasons in Major League Baseball, primarily as a right fielder, for the Cincinnati Reds from 1942 to 1944. He was a native of Randolph, Iowa.

Marshall is one of many ballplayers who only appeared in the major leagues during World War II. He was a regular for the Reds during most of his 2½ years with the team. In 1942, he finished in the league's top ten for sacrifice hits, and in 1943 did the same for triples and stolen bases.

Career totals include 329 games played, 311 hits, 15 home runs, 105 RBI, 140 runs, a .245 batting average, and a slugging percentage of .339. He was an average defensive outfielder for his era, and in his 317 appearances had a fielding percentage of .975. One defensive highlight was 12 assists in 1943.

Marshall died in Salem, Oregon, at the age of 79.
