= Marv Felderman =

American baseball player (1915–2000)

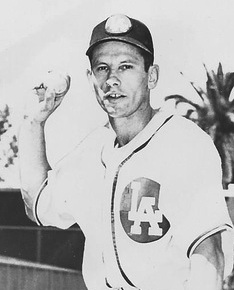
- Catcher
- Born: December 20, 1915; Bellevue, Iowa, U.S.
- Died: August 6, 2000 (aged 84); Riverside, California, U.S.
- Batted: Right Threw: Right

MLB debut
- April 19, 1942, for the Chicago Cubs

Last MLB appearance
- September 22, 1942, for the Chicago Cubs

MLB statistics
- Games: 3
- At bats: 6
- Hits: 1
- Stats at Baseball Reference

Teams
- Chicago Cubs (1942)

Marvin Wilfred Feldman (December 20, 1915 – August 6, 2000) was an American Major League Baseball player. Nicknamed "Coonie", Felderman played for Chicago Cubs in the 1942 season. He only played in three games in his one-year career, having one hit and four strike-outs in six at-bats with one walk. He also appeared in two games as a catcher where he maintained a fielding percentage of 1.000. Felderman was born in Bellevue, Iowa, and died in Riverside, California.
