= Lincoln Links =

- 1906–1961; Lincoln, Nebraska

Minor league affiliations
- Previous classes: Class B (1959–1961); Class A (1947–1958; 1924–1927; 1906–1917); Class D (1938–1939; 1928–1936; 1922–1923)
- Previous leagues: Illinois–Indiana–Iowa League (1959–1961); Western League (1947–1958; 1924–1927; 1906–1917); Western League (Class D) (1939); Nebraska State League (1938; 1928–1936; 1922–1923)

Major league affiliations
- Previous teams: Chicago White Sox (1959–1961); Pittsburgh Pirates (1955–1958); Milwaukee Braves (1953–1954); Philadelphia Athletics (1947–1952); St. Louis Browns (1938–1939); Cincinnati Reds (1936); St. Louis Cardinals (1933–1934)

Minor league titles
- League titles (4): 1923; 1934; 1956; 1957

Team data
- Previous names: Lincoln Chiefs (1953–1961); Lincoln A's/Athletics (1947–1952); Lincoln Links (1917; 1922–1935; 1938–1939); Lincoln Red Links (1936); Lincoln Tigers (1914–1916); Lincoln Railsplitters (1908–1913); Lincoln Treeplanters (1907); Lincoln Ducklings (1906)
- Previous parks: Sherman Field; Landis Field; Antelope Park

The Lincoln Links were an American minor league baseball franchise that represented Lincoln, Nebraska, for 18 seasons over a 23-year period (1917–39) during the 20th century. They played in the Class A Western League (1917; 1924–27), the Class D Nebraska State League (1922–23; 1928–36; 1938) and the Class D Western League of 1939–41 (1939).

Lincoln was first represented in organized baseball in 1886 as the Tree Planters in the reorganized original Western League. Lincoln's 19th-century teams played in various leagues between 1886 and 1895. In 1906, Lincoln joined the Class A Western League as the Ducklings (1906), Treeplanters (1907), Railsplitters (1908–13) and Tigers (1914–16). During this time, team nicknames were often unofficially assigned by sportswriters, and The Encyclopedia of Minor League Baseball, published by Baseball America in 2007, lists other nicknames for the Lincoln franchise of the time, including Greenbackers and Antelopes.

Adopted in 1917, Links was the most widely used of the several nicknames associated with Lincoln teams during the 20th century. They played home games at Antelope Park (through 1917) and Landis Field (after 1922) and won Nebraska State League championships in 1923 (under manager O.A. Beltzer), and 1934 (under Cy Lingle and Pug Griffin). Upon the introduction of the farm system, the Links were linked with Major League Baseball's St. Louis Cardinals (1933–34), Cincinnati Reds (1936, as the Red Links), and St. Louis Browns (1938–39).

== After World War II: A new league, team, name and ballpark ==
The Class A Western League had folded during the Great Depression in 1937, but with the boom in baseball attendance following World War II, it was revived in 1947 by U.S. Senator Edwin C. Johnson of Colorado.

Lincoln was one of six cities represented in the 1947 Western League as the A's, reflecting its affiliation with the Philadelphia Athletics. The Lincoln A's moved into a new ballpark, Sherman Field, named for franchise owner Charles "Cy" Sherman, and played for six seasons (1947–52), making the playoffs twice. Baseball Hall of Fame second baseman Nellie Fox batted .311 for the 1948 Lincoln A's in his last season as a minor leaguer.

However, in 1953 the Athletics abandoned Lincoln and were replaced by the Milwaukee Braves, who fielded a club identified by its final nickname, the Lincoln Chiefs. The Chiefs struggled on the field for their first three seasons, but in 1956, in the team's second year as an affiliate of the Pittsburgh Pirates, they won the Western League's first half and playoff championships. The 1956 Chiefs, managed by Larry Shepard, were paced by two standout performances. First baseman Dick Stuart clubbed 66 home runs — still the fourth-most in minor league history — and also led the league with 158 runs batted in. Pitcher Bennie Daniels, meanwhile, compiled a 15–3 win–loss record.

The 1957 Chiefs repeated as Western League champions, edging out the Amarillo Gold Sox by a single game. But the Western League was in its twilight years; plagued by declining attendance and the defection of teams such as the Omaha Cardinals and Denver Bears to higher-level circuits, it folded after the 1958 campaign, one in which the Chiefs placed third in the league and in home attendance.

== A Nebraska team in the Three-I League ==
The Chiefs played for three more seasons in organized baseball as a member of the Class B Illinois–Indiana–Iowa League and an affiliate of the Chicago White Sox. But the Three-I League was also suffering from the woes that plagued the Western circuit, and it disbanded after the 1961 season.

Lincoln would be without professional baseball until the advent of the independent league Lincoln Saltdogs in 2001.

== Notable alumni of the Lincoln A's and Chiefs (1947–61) ==
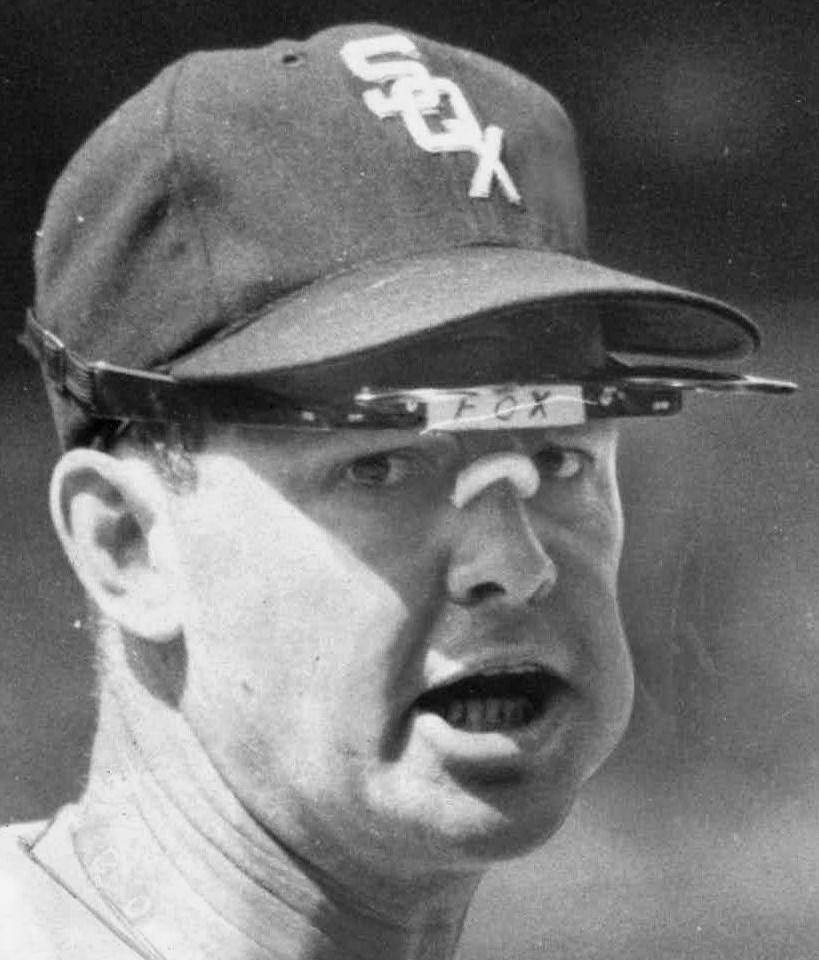
Nellie Fox

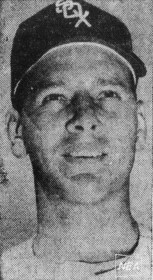
Joe Horlen

Hall of Fame alumni

- Nellie Fox Inducted, 1997

Notable alumni

- Don Buford
- Joe Christopher
- Bennie Daniels
- Jim Duffalo
- Joe Gibbon
- Dick Hall
- Ken Hamlin
- Mike Hershberger
- Joe Hoerner
- Joe Horlen
- Al Jackson
- Julián Javier
- Jack Lamabe
- Bob Locker
- Jerry McNertney
- Dan Osinski
- Arnie Portocarrero
- Bobby Shantz
- Dick Stuart
- Al Weis
- Dave Wickersham
