= Jim Dyck =

American baseball player (1922–1999)

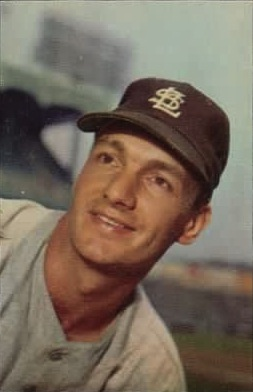
- Dyck in about 1953
- Third baseman / Left fielder
- Born: February 3, 1922; Omaha, Nebraska, U.S.
- Died: January 11, 1999 (aged 76); Cheney, Washington, U.S.
- Batted: Right Threw: Right

MLB debut
- September 27, 1951, for the St. Louis Browns

Last MLB appearance
- July 22, 1956, for the Cincinnati Redlegs

MLB statistics
- Batting average: .246
- Home runs: 26
- Runs batted in: 114
- Stats at Baseball Reference

Teams
- St. Louis Browns (1951–1953); Cleveland Indians (1954); Baltimore Orioles (1955–1956); Cincinnati Redlegs (1956)

James Robert Dyck (February 3, 1922 – January 11, 1999) was an American third baseman and left fielder in Major League Baseball who played for four different teams between 1951 and 1956. Listed at 6 ft 2 in (1.88 m), 200 lb., Dyck batted and threw right-handed. He was born in Omaha, Nebraska.

Prior to his baseball career Dyck served in the US Navy during World War II.

Dyck entered the majors in 1951 with the St. Louis Browns, playing for them three years before joining the Cleveland Indians (1954), Baltimore Orioles (1955–56) and Cincinnati Redlegs (1956). His most productive season came with the 1952 Browns, when he posted career-highs in home runs (15), RBI (64), runs (60), doubles (22) and games played (122), while hitting a .269 batting average. On July 16, 1953, he entered the books records when the Browns tied, by then, a major league mark with three successive home runs during the first inning of an 8–6 victory over the Yankees. Dyck hit his homer after solo shots belted by Clint Courtney and Dick Kryhoski. Dyck also played every position in his career except for pitcher or catcher.

In a six-season career, Dyck was a .246 hitter (242-for-983) with 26 home runs and 114 in 330 games, including 52 doubles, five triples, four stolen bases, and a .344 on-base percentage.

Following his majors career, Dyck played during three seasons in the Pacific Coast League with the Indians and Reds affiliated teams, before retiring in 1960 to open a family bowling-alley business in Cheney, Washington.

Dyck died in Cheney at the age of 76.
