= Cheyenne Indians (baseball) =

- 1912–1941; (1912, 1941); Cheyenne, Wyoming

Minor league affiliations
- Class: Class D (1912, 1941)
- League: Rocky Mountain League (1912); Western League (1941)

Major league affiliations
- Team: None

Minor league titles
- League titles (1): 1912
- Wild card berths (1): 1941

Team data
- Name: Cheyenne Indians (1912, 1941)
- Ballpark: Pioneer Park (1912, 1941)

The Cheyenne Indians were a minor league baseball team based in Cheyenne, Wyoming. The 1912 Cheyenne "Indians" played briefly as members of the Class D level Rocky Mountain League, with the team winning the league championship in the league's only season. The Indians next played the 1941 season as members of the Class D level Western League, qualifying for the playoffs in their only season of play.

Cheyenne hosted home games at Pioneer Park in both seasons of minor league play.

== History ==
The Cheyenne "Indians" moniker was first used by early amateur and semi–professional teams in Cheyenne, along with other monikers such as the Bachelors, Benedicts, Black Stockings, Eclipse and Nonpareils. However, the Indians moniker would be used for decades by Cheyenne amateur and semi–professional teams.

=== 1912: Rocky Mountain League champions ===
In 1912, Cheyenne first hosted minor league baseball and won a league championship. The Cheyenne Indians became charter members of the short–lived Rocky Mountain League during the season. The Rocky Mountain League began their first season of play on May 6, 1912, as a four-team league, with the Canon City Swastikas, Colorado Springs Millionaires, La Junta Railroaders and Pueblo Indians teams as members to begin the season.

The Rocky Mountain League had evolved from a semi–professional league and formed as a minor league for the 1912 season. On June 8, 1912, playing in the four–team 1912 league, the Pueblo Indians team relocated to Trinidad, Colorado. On June 28, 1912, the franchise subsequently moved from Trinidad to Cheyenne, becoming the Cheyenne Indians. On July 5, 1912, the Rocky Mountain League folded before completing the season. On that date, the Pueblo/Trinidad/Cheyenne franchise was in first place with a 22–7 record, 2.5 games ahead of the second place Raton, New Mexico team when the league folded. The Pueblo/Trinidad/Cheyenne team played the season under managers John Galena and Ira Bidwell in winning the shortened season championship. The 1912 Indians played home games at Pioneer Park while based in Cheyenne.

After the Rocky Mountain League folded, the 1912 Cheyenne Indians continued unofficial play against teams from Fort D.A. Russell and Nebraska.

=== 1941: Western League season ===
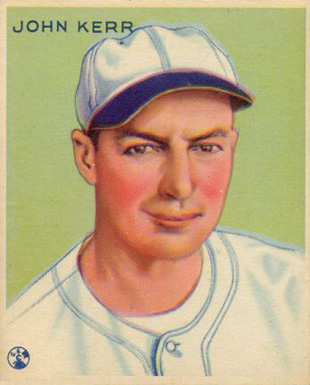
(1933) John Kerr, Washington Senators. Kerr managed Cheyenne to a playoff appearance in 1941.

In 1941, minor league baseball returned to Cheyanne, as the "Indians" team was reestablished and became members of the Western League, playing home games again at Pioneer Park. The addition of Cheyenne and the Denver Bears allowed the league to expand from four–teams to six–teams in 1941. The teams joined with Cheyenne in beginning league play on May 6, 1941

Cheyenne ended the 1941 season in second place in the Western League standings. With a 59–44 record under manager John Kerr, in the regular season standings, Cheyenne finished 2.0 games behind the first place Norfolk Yankees. Cheyenne finished ahead of the Sioux City Cowboys (54–56), Pueblo Rollers (52–54), Sioux Falls Canaries (51–56) and Denver Bears (42–68) teams and qualified for the four team playoffs. In the first round of Western League playoffs, the Pueblo Rollers defeated Cheyenne 3 games to 2. The Western League ceased play after the 1941 season due to World War II. Mel Bergman of Cheyenne led the Western League with 10 home runs, while teammate George Milstead had a league leading 19 wins.

After the conclusion of World War II, the Western League reformed in 1947 without a Cheyenne franchise. The 1941 Indians were the last minor league team hosted in Cheyenne.

== The ballpark ==
The Cheyenne Indians hosted minor league home games at Pioneer Park in both seasons. Originally built in 1896 with rodeo stands, Pioneer Park had a capacity of 2,000. The 1941 Cheyenne Indians season tickets cost $20 and single game tickets were 40 cents, with single game tickets for soldiers costing 25 cents. Pioneer Park is still in use as a public park, hosting a ballpark today. Pioneer Park is located at 1331 Talbot Court in Cheyenne, Wyoming.

== Timeline ==
Year(s)	# Yrs.	Team	Level	League	Ballpark
1912	1	Cheyenne Indians	Class D	Rocky Mountain League	Pioneer Park
1941	1	Cheyenne Indians	Class D	Western League	Pioneer Park

== Year-by-year records ==
Year	Record	Finish	Manager	Playoffs/Notes
1912	22–7	1st	John Galena / Ira Bidwell	Pueblo moved to Trinidad June 8 Trinidad moved to Cheyenne June 28; League disbanded July 5
1941	59–44	2nd	John Kerr	Lost in 1st round

== Notable alumni ==
- Bill Evans (1941)
- John Kerr (1941, MGR)
- George Milstead (1941)
- Cheyenne Indians players
