= Aspen Miners =

- 1889–1898; (1889, 1895–1896, 1898); Aspen, Colorado

Minor league affiliations
- Class: Independent (1889, 1895–1896, 1898)
- League: Colorado State League (1889, 1895–1896, 1898)

Major league affiliations
- Team: None

Minor league titles
- League titles (1): 1898

Team data
- Name: Aspen Silver Kings (1889); Aspen Miners (1895–1896, 1898)
- Ballpark: Athletic Park (1889, 1895–1896, 1898)

The Aspen Miners were a minor league baseball team based in Aspen, Colorado. Between 1889 and 1898, Aspen teams played as exclusively as members of the Colorado State League, playing in the 1889, 1895, 1896 and 1898 seasons and capturing the 1898 league championship. The 1889 team was known as the Aspen Silver Kings.

The Aspen teams hosted minor league home games at Athletic Park.

== History ==
Minor league baseball began in Aspen, Colorado, when the 1889 Aspen Silver Kings became members of the Independent level Colorado State League.

In 1889, Aspen began their first season of minor league play at a new ballfield built with a land donation from David Hyman, owner of the Durant Mine and Smuggler Mine. While in third place with a record of 25–30 under managers Ford and Jim Adams, the Aspen Silver Kings disbanded on July 29, 1889. Aspen was 10.5 games behind the first place Pueblo Ponies (37–21) when the franchise folded. The Colorado Springs (41–34), Denver Solis (12–18) and Leadville Blues (19–31) teams were the other 1889 Colorado State League members. After Denver folded early in the 1889 season, Aspen had traveled by train to play other league teams, but travel expenses were a hindrance.

Following the 1889 Colorado State League season, there were efforts to form new league in 1890. The league would have featured teams in Aspen, Denver, Glenwood Springs, Salt Lake City, Colorado Springs and Leadville. But, the league never officially formed.

Aspen and the Colorado State League teams were plagued by poor weather, financial issues and were greatly affected by the silver crash of 1893.

The "Aspen Miners" resumed play as members of the 1895 Colorado State League. The 1895 league records and rosters are unknown.

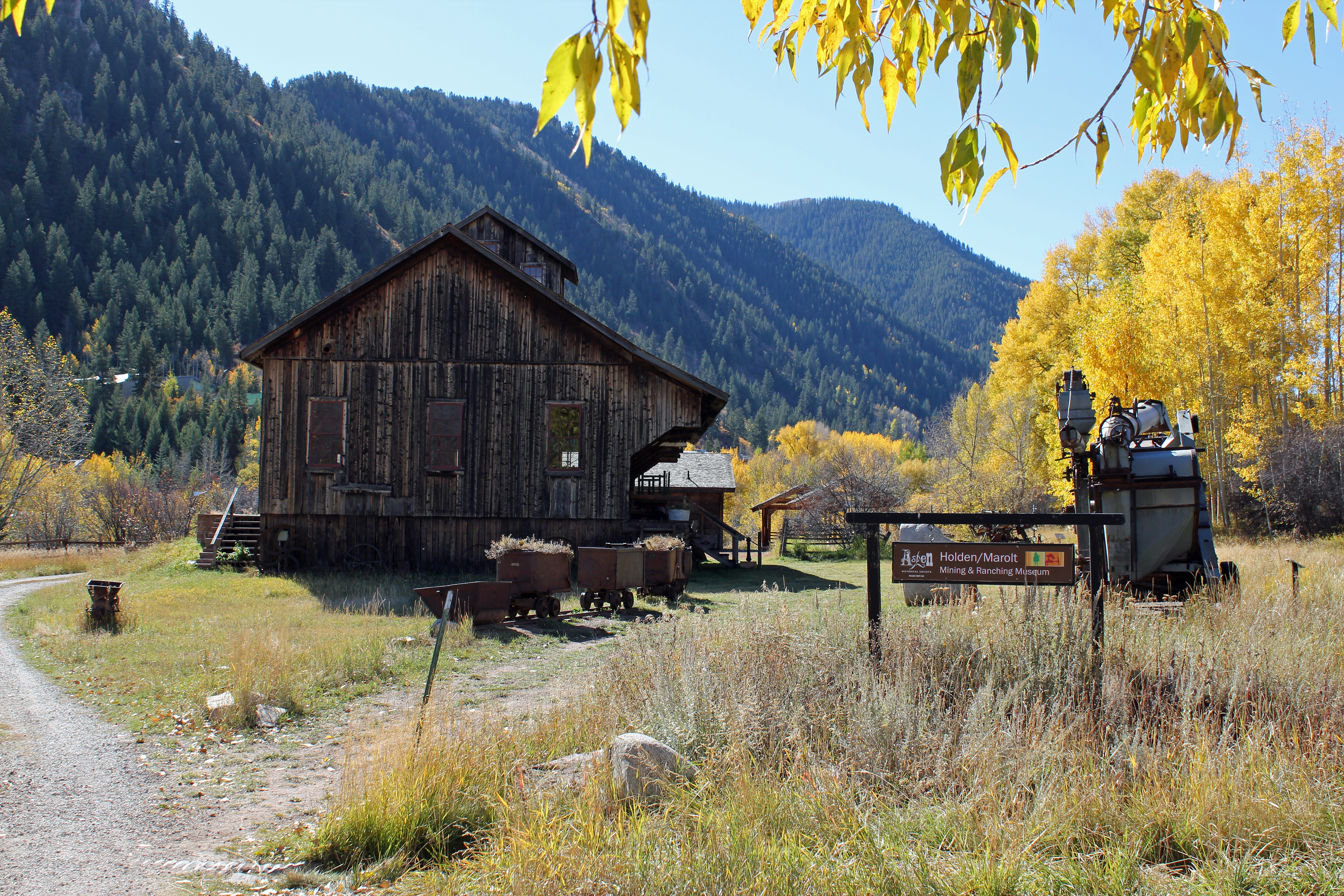
Holden Mining and Smelting Company, Aspen, Colorado

The 1896 Aspen Miners continued play and finished in fourth place in the six–team Colorado State League. Prices at the ballpark ranged from .25 cents to .50 cents. Aspen finished with a record of 5–5 under managers Edwin Kidder and A. Magnam. Aspen finished with the Colorado Springs (0–6), Cripple Creek/Gillette (4–4), Denver Gulfs (5–5), Leadville Angels (5–3) and 1st place Pueblo Rovers (7–3) in the league standings. The league began play on May 2, 1896, and ended on July 15, 1896.

In 1898, the Aspen Miners won the Colorado State League championship in their final season. Seven teams played in the 1898 league and were led by Aspen with a 35–21 record under manager A. Magnam, who also served a dual role as commissioner of the Colorado State League in 1898. The Aspen Miners disbanded on July 31, 1898, and the Colorado State League permanently folded following the 1898 season.

Aspen, Colorado has not hosted another minor league team.

== The ballpark ==
Aspen teams hosted their minor league home games at Athletic Park. In 1889, David Hyman, owner of the Durant and Smuggler mines, donated 110 building lots owned by his Hallam Land Company to build a baseball park and an adjacent race course. It was noted that the ballpark was relocated in 1895 to a nearby location due to expansion of the horse race portion of the site. The ballpark was noted to have been located near current intersection of Castle Creek Road and Highway 82, near today's Aspen Meadows in Aspen, Colorado.

== Timeline ==
Year(s)	# Yrs.	Team	Level	League	Ballpark
1889	1	Aspen Silver Kings	Independent	Colorado State League	Athletic Park
1895–1896, 1898	3	Aspen Miners	Independent	Colorado State League	Athletic Park

== Year–by–year records ==
Year	Record	Finish	Manager	Playoffs/Notes
1889	25–30	NA	Ford / Jim Adams	Team disbanded July 29
1895	0-0	NA	NA	1895 records unknown
1896	5–5	4th	Edwin Kidder / A. Magnam	No playoffs held
1898	35–21	1st	A. Magnam	Team disbanded July 31; League champions

== Notable alumni ==
- Jim Adams (1889, MGR)
- Boileryard Clarke (1889)
- George Decker (1889)
- Fred Osborne (1889)
- Ed Siever (1898)

== See also ==
- Aspen (minor league baseball) players
