= Louisville Coal Miners =

- 1898; Louisville, Colorado

Minor league affiliations
- Class: Independent (1898)
- League: Colorado State League (1898)

Major league affiliations
- Team: None

Minor league titles
- League titles (0): None

Team data
- Name: Louisville Coal Miners (1898)
- Ballpark: Athletic Grounds (1898)

The Louisville Coal Miners were a minor league baseball team based in Louisville, Colorado. In 1898, the Coal Miners briefly played as members of the Colorado State League, hosting home games at the Athletic Grounds. Louisville folded during the 1898 season.

== History ==
Minor league baseball began in Louisville, Colorado, when the 1898 Louisville Coal Miners became members of the six–team Independent level Colorado State League.

The use of the "Coal Miners" moniker by Louisville corresponds to local industry and history. Coal mining in Louisville, Colorado was the prominent industry in the era. Opened in 1877, the Welch Mine was the first mine in Louisville, followed by the Acme Mine in 1888 and Caledonia Mine in 1890.

In 1898, the Louisville Coal Miners placed second in the Colorado State League standings behind the Aspen Miners, who won the championship in the final season of the league. Six teams played in the 1898 league, led by Aspen with a 35–21 record. Louisville placed second with a 10–11 record, playing the season under manager Thomas Hinton. The Denver Grizzlies, Fort Collins Farmers, Leadville Blues and Pueblo Rovers rounded out the 1898 league members. The Louisville Coal Miners franchise disbanded on July 7, 1898, Aspen disbanded on July 27, 1898 and the Colorado State League permanently folded following the 1898 season.

Louisville player Ralph Glaze played numerous seasons of minor league baseball under the assumed name of "Ralph Pearce" to protect his college football and baseball eligibility.

Louisville, Colorado has not hosted another minor league team.

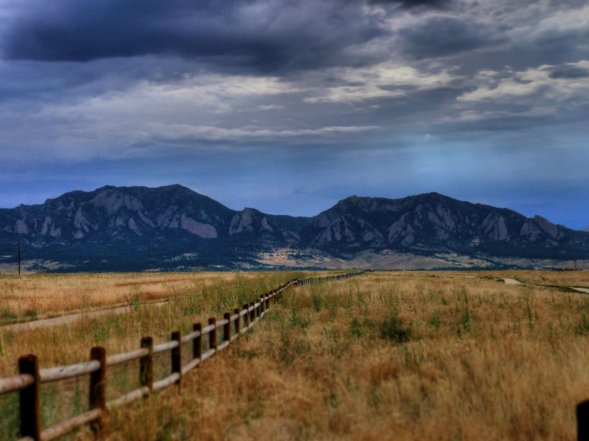
(2007) McCasslin Boulevard, just outside of Louisville, Colorado.

== The ballpark ==
The Louisville Coal Miners played home minor league games at the Athletic Grounds. In the era, the ballpark was on Lee Avenue, located just a few hundred feet from the operational Caledonia Mine. The ballpark is still in use today on the same plot of land and is called Miners Field. The address is 1212 South Street in Louisville, Colorado.

== Year–by–year record ==
Year	Record	Finish	Manager	Playoffs/Notes
1898	10–11	2nd	Thomas Hinton	Team disbanded July 7

== Notable alumni ==
- Ralph Glaze (1898)
- Louisville Coal Miners players
