= Mike Corcoran (baseball) =

American baseball player (1858–1927)

- Pitcher
- Born: October 10, 1858; Brooklyn, New York
- Died: October 11, 1927 (aged 69); East Setauket, New York
- Batted: Unknown Threw: Unknown

MLB debut
- July 15, 1884, for the Chicago White Stockings

Last MLB appearance
- July 15, 1884, for the Chicago White Stockings

MLB statistics
- Win–loss record: 0–1
- Earned run average: 4.00
- Strikeout: 2

Teams
- Chicago White Stockings (1884)

Michael Corcoran (October 10, 1858 – October 11, 1927) was a Major League Baseball pitcher who played for the Chicago White Stockings (later renamed Chicago Cubs) of the National League. Mike's brother, Larry Corcoran, was also a Chicago White Stockings pitcher, and was Mike's teammate in 1884.

Mike played semi-pro baseball in New England in 1883, and participated in spring training with the New York Metropolitans of the American Association but did not make the team. He started one game for the White Stockings on July 15, 1884, in a game against the Detroit Wolverines at Recreation Park. He pitched all 9 innings for a complete game but gave up 16 hits and 14 runs, 4 of which were earned, and was charged with the loss in a 14–0 defeat. He also struck out 2 batters. The Inter Ocean wrote that "The Chicagos, thinking they could win with any pitcher, presented a brother of Larry Corcoran’s and the home team made him think he had better sign with amateurs." The Detroit Free Press said that "There is a strong resemblance between the brothers in feature, stature and action, but not in effectiveness." According to the St. Louis Post-Dispatch, after the game Corcoran "went home satisfied that he is not a pitcher." Larry Corcoran pitched both the game before and the game after Mike Corcoran's start, giving the Corcoran brothers three consecutive starts.

In 1885 Corcoran played in the Colorado State League, with records of him playing for at least 3 teams in the league – the Leadville Blues, Pueblo Ponies and Denver Solis. When not playing baseball Corcoran worked as a carpenter. He died in 1927 from a heart disease.
