= List of cemeteries in New Mexico =

This list of cemeteries in New Mexico includes currently operating, historical (closed for new interments), and defunct (graves abandoned or removed) cemeteries, columbaria, and mausolea which are historical and/or notable. It does not include pet cemeteries.

== Bernalillo County ==
- Albuquerque Indian School Cemetery, 4H Park, Albuquerque

== Catron County ==
- Cooney's Tomb and Cemetery, Alma

== Colfax County ==
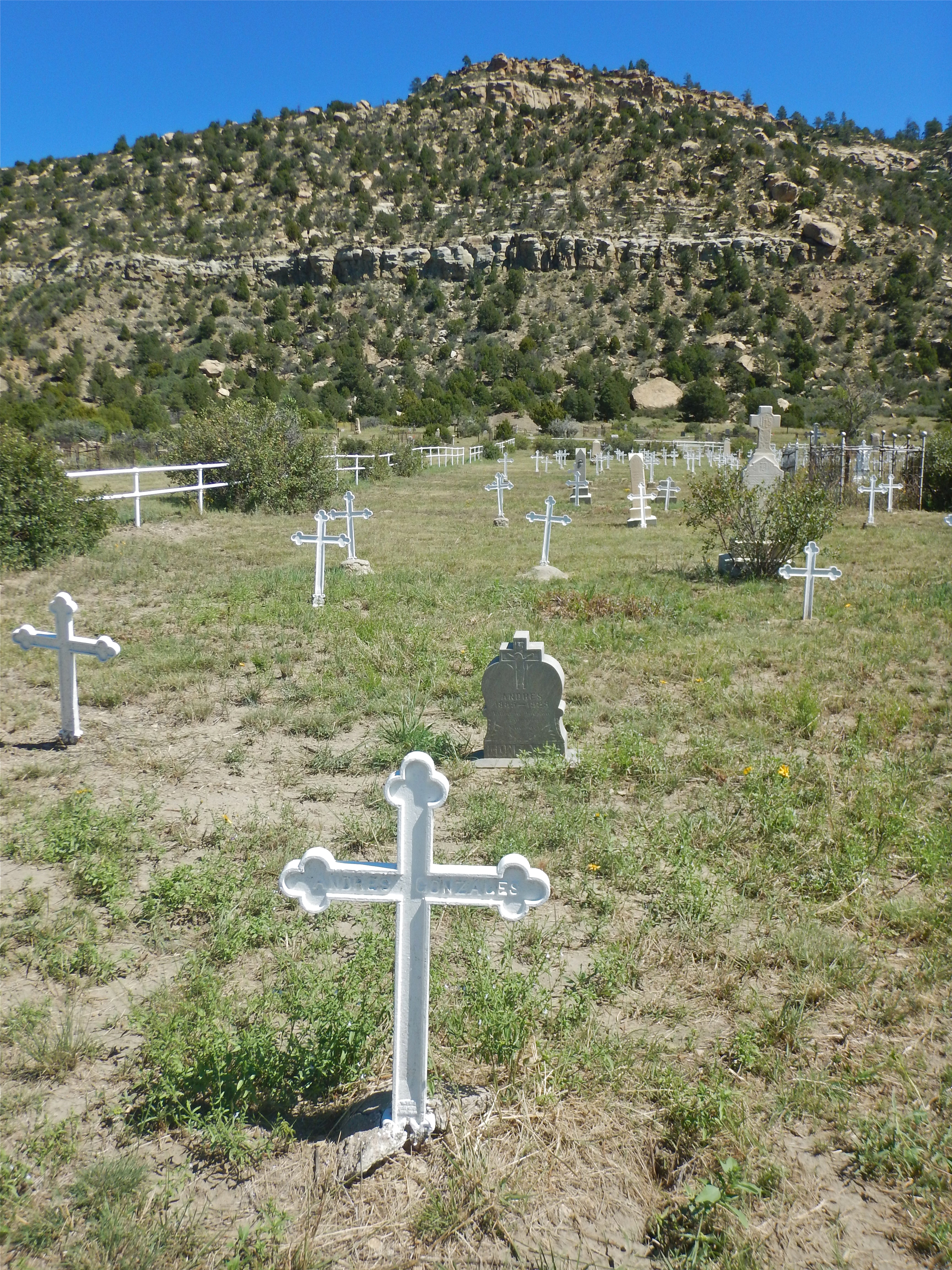
Unmarked crosses of mining disaster victims at Dawson Cemetery, Dawson, Colfax County

- Dawson Cemetery, Dawson; NRHP-listed

== Grant County ==
- Fort Bayard National Cemetery, Silver City; NRHP-listed

== Santa Fe County ==
- Fairview Cemetery, Santa Fe; NRHP-listed
- Nuestra Senora de Luz Church and Cemetery, Canoncito; NRHP-listed
- Santa Fe National Cemetery, Santa Fe

== See also ==
- List of cemeteries in the United States
- Pioneer cemetery
