= Dawson Stags =

- 1912; Dawson, New Mexico

Minor league affiliations
- Class: Class D (1912)
- League: Rocky Mountain League (1912)

Major league affiliations
- Team: None

Minor league titles
- League titles (0): None

Team data
- Name: Dawson Stags (1912)
- Ballpark: Unknown (1912)

The Dawson Stags were a minor league baseball team based in Dawson, New Mexico in 1912. Dawson briefly played in the 1912 season as members of the Class D level Rocky Mountain League. The Dawson team began play when the Colorado Springs Millionaires relocated during the season. Dawson, New Mexico did not host another minor league team and is a ghost town today.

== History ==
The 1912 Dawson Stags became members of the four–team Class D level Rocky Mountain League during the season. The league started the season with the Cañon City Swastikas, Colorado Springs Millionaires, La Junta Railroaders and Pueblo Indians beginning Rocky Mountain League play. During the season, Colorado Springs relocated to Dawson.

On June 15, 1912, the Colorado Springs Millionaires franchise relocated to Dawson, New Mexico.

The "Stags" moniker corresponds directly to the local mining industry. The mines in Dawson were numbered and referred to as Stag Canyon Mine. Stag Canyon Mine No. 2 and Stag Canyon Mine No. 1 suffered major explosions in 1913 and 1923, killing hundreds of mine workers.

Before the end of the 1912 season, the Rocky Mountain League permanently folded on July 5, 1912. The Colorado Springs/Dawson team was in 3rd place with a 11–20 overall record when the league stopped play. Playing under manager Harry Brammell, Colorado Springs/Dawson finished 12.5 games behind the first place Pueblo/Cheyenne Indians team.

After 1912, Dawson did not host another minor league team. When the local coal mines closed in the 1950s, Dawson had no remaining industry and became a ghost town. After the residents left the city, the hospital, school, stores, churches, and homes were destroyed and bulldozed into the mined area, which was covered with dirt.

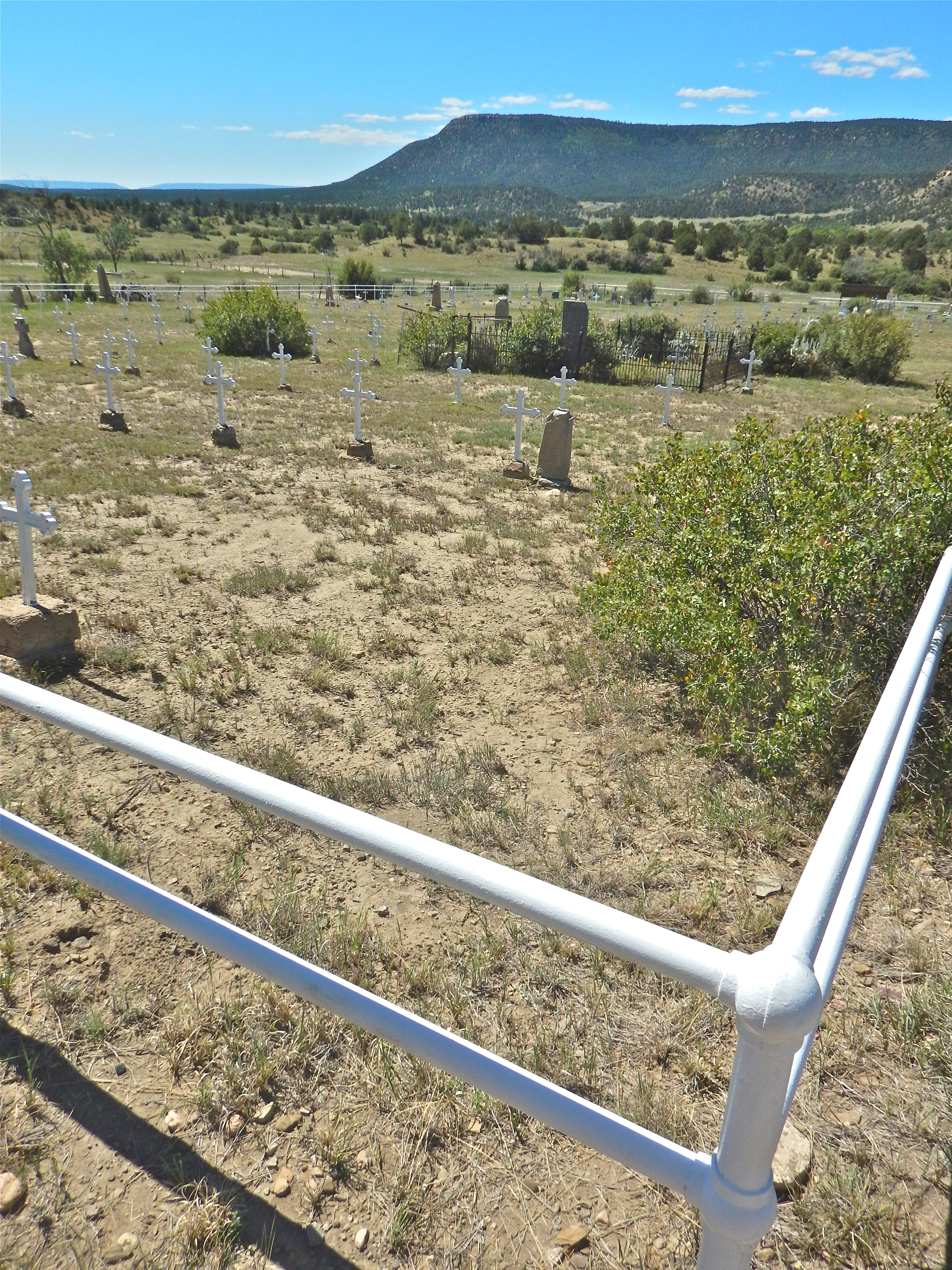
Corner of graveyard with unmarked crosses, Dawson Cemetery, NM

== The ballpark ==
The exact name of the Dawson Stags' home ballpark is not known.

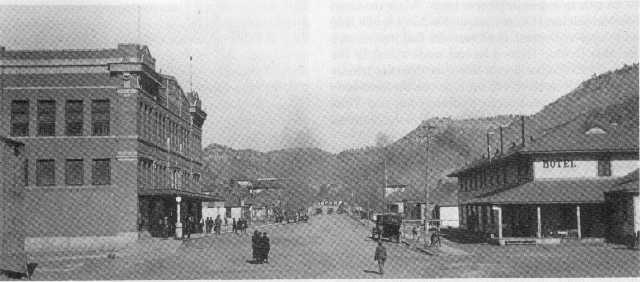
(1916) Main Street. Dawson, New Mexico

== Timeline ==
Year(s)	# Yrs.	Team	Level	League
1912 (1)	1	Colorado Springs Millionaires	Class D	Rocky Mountain League
1912 (2)	1	Dawson Stags	Class D	Rocky Mountain League

== Year–by–year records ==
Year	Record	Finish	Manager	Playoffs/Notes
1912	10–20	3rd	Harry Brammell	Colorado Springs moved to Dawson June 15

== Notable alumni ==
- Roster information for the 1912 Colorado Springs/Dawson team is unknown.

== See also ==
- List of ghost towns in New Mexico
