= Cañon City Swastikas =

- 1912; Cañon City, Colorado

Minor league affiliations
- Class: Class D (1912)
- League: Rocky Mountain League (1912)

Major league affiliations
- Team: None

Minor league titles
- League titles (0): None

Team data
- Name: Cañon City Swastikas (1912)
- Ballpark: Centennial Park (1912)

The Cañon City Swastikas were a minor league baseball team based in Cañon City, Colorado, in 1912. Cañon City briefly played in the 1912 season as members of the Class D level Rocky Mountain League, before the Cañon City franchise relocated to Raton, New Mexico, during the season. Canon City hosted minor league home games at Centennial Park.

== History ==
An early Cañon City based team called the "Cañon City Inter-Ocean Base Ball Club" played organized baseball, beginning in 1874.

The 1912 Cañon City Swastikas began minor league baseball play in Cañon City. Cañon City became charter members of the four–team Class D level Rocky Mountain League in 1912. The league started the season with the Colorado Springs Millionaires, La Junta Railroaders and the Pueblo, Colorado, teams joining Cañon City in league play.

On June 4, 1912, the Cañon City franchise relocated to Raton, New Mexico. The team had a 5–6 record under manager Jack Farrell at the time they relocated to Raton.

The team's use of the "Swastikas" moniker has roots that are unknown. (Note: Contemporary newspaper reports about the team during 1912 refer only to Canon City; the use of any nickname is absent. A brand of coal known as "Swastika Sugarite" was associated with Raton, New Mexico, where the team relocated to.) When the team franchise moved to New Mexico, they became the first minor league team based in New Mexico. Shortly after, the Colorado Springs Millionaires franchise moved to Dawson, New Mexico, and became the Dawson Stags.

The Rocky Mountain League permanently folded on July 5, 1912, before the completion of the scheduled season. At the time the league folded, the Cañon City/Raton team was in second place with a 20–14 overall record. Cañon City/Raton finished 4.5 games behind the first place Pueblo/Cheyenne Indians team in the final league standings.

Since 1912, Cañon City, Colorado, has not hosted another minor league team.

== Ballpark ==
Cañon City was noted to have hosted minor league home games at Centennial Park. Possibly having another name in 1912, Centennial Park is still in use today as a public park with ballfields. Centennial Park is located at 221 Griffin Avenue, Cañon City, Colorado.

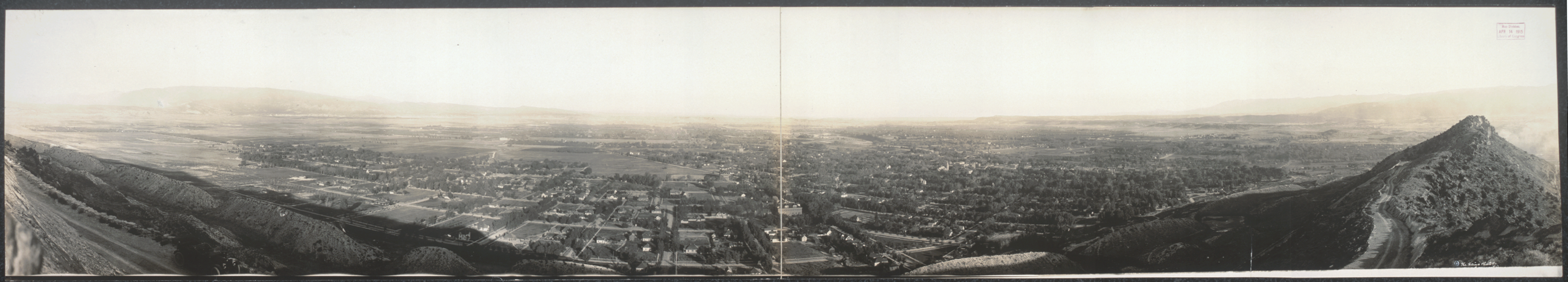
(1915) Panorama of Canon City, Colorado

== Timeline ==
Year(s)	# Yrs.	Team	Level	League
1912 (1)	1	Cañon City Swastikas	Class D	Rocky Mountain League
1912 (2)	1	Raton Swastikas	Class D	Rocky Mountain League

== Year–by–year record ==
Year	Record	Finish	Manager	Playoffs/Notes
1912	20–14	2nd	Jack Farrell	Moved to Raton June 4; 5–6 in Cañon City

== Players ==
Roster information for the 1912 Cañon City team is lacking in online baseball reference sites. An article in the Kansas City Times on May 23, 1912—the day before the start of the league's regular season—gave the team's roster as:

- Infielders: Albert Smith, Bill Kemmer, Maurice McKnight, Clifford Marr, and Hobson
- Outfielders: Mart Henry, Barrackman, George Henry
- Catcher: John Peters
- Pitchers: Art Hanna, Curtis, Wilder, and Littler

Bill Kemmer had played for the major-league Louisville Colonels in 1895, and John Peters later played for three major-league teams between 1915 and 1922.
