= Dawson Cemetery =

Cemetery in Colfax County, New Mexico

- U.S. National Register of Historic Places
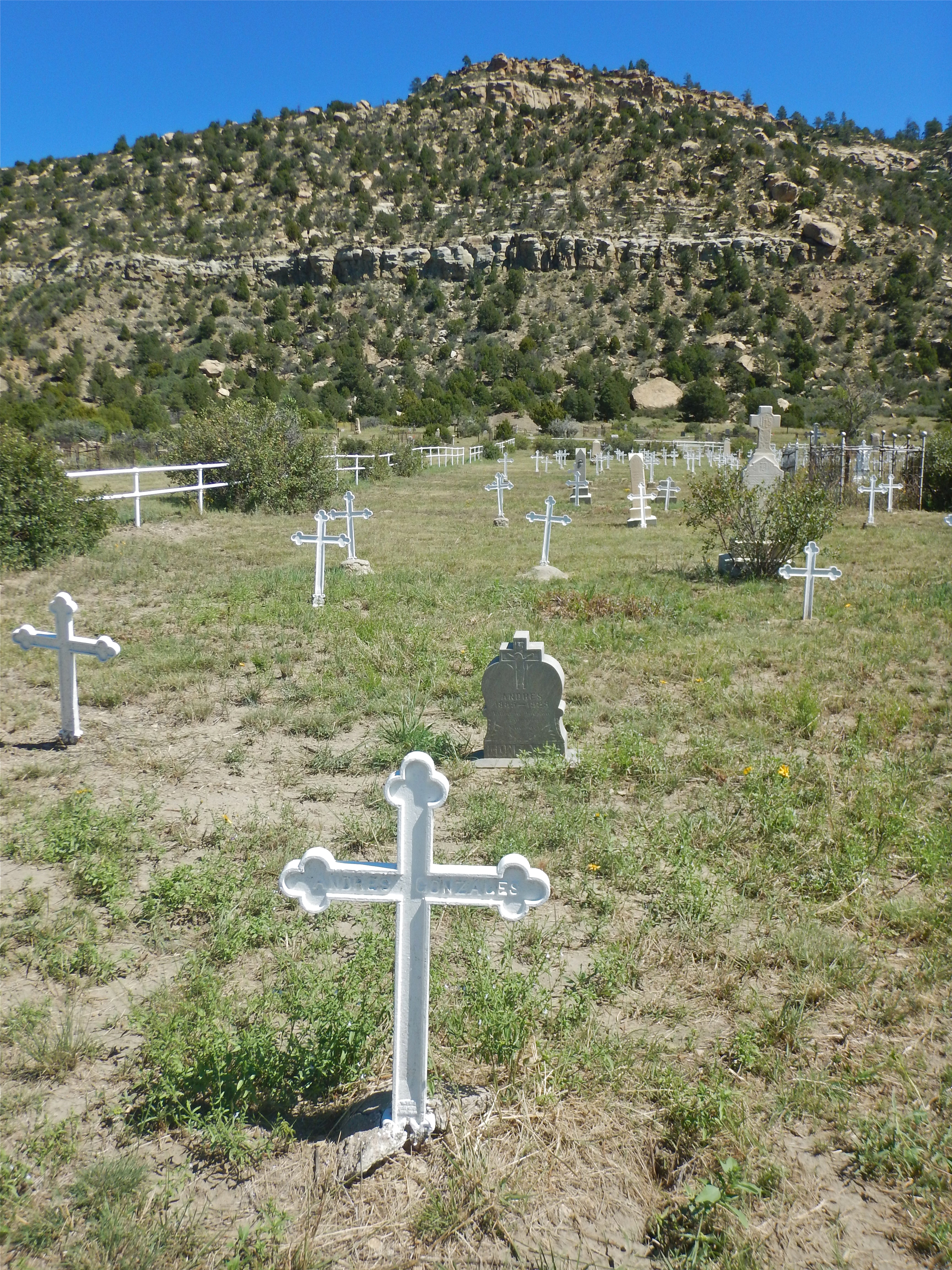
- Crosses in Dawson Cemetery

- Location within New Mexico
- Location: Approximately 4 mi. NW of jct. of US 64 and the Dawson Rd., Dawson, Colfax County, New Mexico, U.S.
- Coordinates: 36°39′19″N 104°46′03″W
- Area: 9 acres (3.6 ha)
- Built: 1913
- NRHP reference No.: 92000249
- Added to NRHP: April 9, 1992

Dawson Cemetery is a historic cemetery in Dawson, New Mexico. It was established in 1913. It has been listed on the National Register of Historic Places since April 9, 1992.

== History ==
Dawson was the site of two separate coal mining disasters in 1913 and 1923, and is a ghost town. The Phelps Dodge Mining Company has historically invested in the restoration of this cemetery, which was awarded recognition in 1991 from Representative E. Kelly Mora.

The three sections of the burial ground are surrounded by barbed wire or iron pipe fence and it contains roughly 600 marked graves. The cemetery includes the graves of World War II casualties and coal miners; as well as immigrants from southern and eastern Europe and from Mexico.

== See also ==
- National Register of Historic Places listings in Colfax County, New Mexico
- List of cemeteries in New Mexico
