= Boileryard Clarke =

American baseball player, coach, and manager (1868–1959)

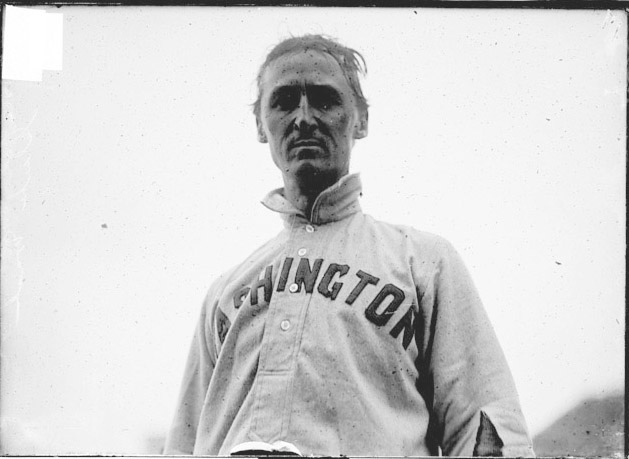
- Catcher / First baseman
- Born: October 18, 1868; New York City, New York, U.S.
- Died: July 29, 1959 (aged 90); Princeton, New Jersey, U.S.
- Batted: Right Threw: Right

MLB debut
- May 1, 1893, for the Baltimore Orioles

Last MLB appearance
- October 7, 1905, for the New York Giants

MLB statistics
- Batting average: .256
- Home runs: 20
- Runs batted in: 429
- Stats at Baseball Reference

Teams
- Baltimore Orioles (1893–1898); Boston Beaneaters (1899–1900); Washington Senators (1901–1904); New York Giants (1905)

Career highlights and awards
- World Series champion (1905)

William Jones "Boileryard" Clarke (October 18, 1868 – July 29, 1959) was an American Major League Baseball player from New York City who played catcher from 1893 to 1905. Clarke also served as the long-time head baseball coach for Princeton University, where Bill Clarke Field is named in his honor. Clarke played for the Baltimore Orioles (1893–1898), Boston Beaneaters (1899–1900), Washington Senators (1901–1904), and New York Giants (1905).

== Biography ==
Clarke was born on October 18, 1868, in New York City. He moved to the then New Mexico Territory in his early childhood, was raised in Indian territory, and studied civil engineering in Santa Fe at Brothers College. He began his professional career with the Pueblo Ponies of the Colorado State League in 1889, and played for the Ottumwa Coal Palaces in the 1890 Illinois-Iowa League. After playing for the San Francisco Friscos and San Jose Dukes of the California League in 1891 and 1892, Clarke made his debut for the Baltimore Orioles of the National League on May 1, 1893. Clarke would play in 13 major league seasons. He said that his nickname, "Boileryard", was given to him because of his voice, explaining, "I had a terrible voice which you could hear all over the diamond."

During his major league career, he also assisted the Princeton University baseball team as a coach from 1897 to 1901. He returned to Princeton in 1909, approximately four years after his retirement from baseball, and stayed until 1927. He came out of retirement again to be an assistant coach for Princeton in 1934, and in 1936 was named manager of the team, and stayed in the position until 1944, when retired again, this time at the age of 75. His managerial record at Princeton was 564–322–10 and his tenure in athletics there was longer than anybody else's. He also managed minor league teams in Allentown, Pennsylvania; Toledo, Ohio; and the Albany Senators in Albany, New York. Bill Clarke Field, the home of Princeton baseball since 1961, is named in his honor.

Clarke died in Princeton, New Jersey, at the age of 90, of complications suffered from a broken hip resulting from a fall. He was survived by his wife of 64 years and a granddaughter. He is interred at Druid Ridge Cemetery in Pikesville, Maryland, in the Evergreen Section.
