= John Barkley Dawson =

- Born: November 10, 1830
- Died: December 27, 1918 (aged 88)
- Occupation: rancher
- Known for: Dawson, New Mexico

John Barkley Dawson (November 10, 1830 – December 27, 1918) was a US Rancher and namesake of the town of Dawson, New Mexico, which is located on land that he bought in 1869 and sold in 1901.
