= Jim Adams (baseball) =

American baseball player (born 1868)

- Catcher
- Born: 1868; East St. Louis, Illinois, U.S.
- Batted: unknown Threw: right

MLB debut
- April 21, 1890, for the St. Louis Browns

Last MLB appearance
- April 21, 1890, for the St. Louis Browns

MLB statistics
- Games played: 1
- At bats: 4
- Hits: 1
- Stats at Baseball Reference

Teams
- St. Louis Browns (1890)

James J. Adams (born 1868) was an American Major League Baseball catcher. He played professionally for the St. Louis Browns.

== Career ==
Adams was born in 1868 in East St. Louis, Illinois. He played in one game for the St. Louis Browns on April 21, 1890. He hit one single in four at-bats during the game. In addition to his brief appearance for the Browns, he played on various minor league teams from 1889–1892 and again in 1899–1900.

He was briefly the player/manager of the Aspen, Colorado team in the Colorado State League in 1889.
