= Leadville Blues =

- 1885–1898; (1885–1886, 1889, 1895–1896, 1898); Leadville, Colorado

Minor league affiliations
- Class: Independent (1885–1886, 1889, 1895–1896, 1898)
- League: Colorado State League (1885); Western League (1886); Colorado State League (1889, 1896, 1898)

Major league affiliations
- Team: None

Minor league titles
- League titles (0): None

Team data
- Name: Leadville Blues (1885–1886, 1889, 1895); Leadville Angels (1896); Leadville Blues (1898)
- Ballpark: Leadville Base Ball Grounds (1885–1886, 1889, 1895–1896, 1898)

The Leadville Blues were a minor league baseball team based in Leadville, Colorado. Between 1885 and 1898, Leadville teams played as members of the 1885 Colorado State League, 1886 Western League and Colorado State League in 1889, 1896 and 1898. The 1896 team was known as the Leadville "Angels." The Blues and Angels hosted minor league home games at the Leadville Base Ball Grounds.

== History ==
The Leadville "Blues" were formed in 1882, playing as a semi–pro team and compiling a 34–8–1 record playing against other Colorado-based town teams. A noted player on the 1882 team was pitcher Dave Foutz.

Minor league baseball began in Leadville, Colorado, when the 1885 Leadville Blues became members of the independent level Colorado State League. The Leadville Blues ended the 1885 season with a record of 7–13, placing third in the final standings, 5.0 games behind the first place Denver team. John Morgan and N.T. Thorne served as Leadville managers.

The Leadville Blues became members of the Western League in 1886. The Blues ended the 1886 season with a record of 39–41, placing third in the league standings under manager D. W. Morgan, finishing 13.0 games behind the first place Denver Mountain Lions in the final standings.

The 1889 Leadville Blues of the Colorado State League ended the season with a record of 19–31, placing fourth in the final standings. Deacon White, Butch Blake and John Foutz served as managers, as Leadville finished behind first place Colorado Springs in the five–team league.

Leadville played as members of the 1895 the Colorado State League. The league records and statistics for the 1895 season are unknown.

The 1896 Leadville Angels continued Colorado State League play and finished in second place in the six–team league. Leadville had one 1996 game delayed 30 minutes due to a snowstorm. The league began play on May 2, 1896, and concluded the season on July 15, 1896. Leadville finished with a record of 5–3 under manager Harry Grier. Leadville finished with the Aspen Miners (5–3), Colorado Springs (0–6), Cripple Creek/Gillette (4–4), Denver Gulfs (5–5), and first place Pueblo Rovers (7–3) in the league standings.

In 1898, the Leadville Blues played their final season under returning manager Harry Grier. It is known the Aspen Miners had the Colorado State League's best record before folding during the season and seven teams played in the 1898 league, led by Aspen with a 35–21 record, with Leadville's record unknown. Aspen manager A. Magnam also served a dual role as commissioner of the Colorado State League in 1898. The Aspen Miners disbanded on July 31, 1898, and the Colorado State League permanently folded following the 1898 season.

Leadville, Colorado has not hosted another minor league team.

== The ballpark ==
The Leadville Blues played home games at a "stadium" built for the team in 1882. The Leadville Base Ball Grounds were noted to have been located at North Harrison Avenue & East 13th Street in Leadville, Colorado. The ballpark location is near today's National Mining Hall of Fame and Museum.

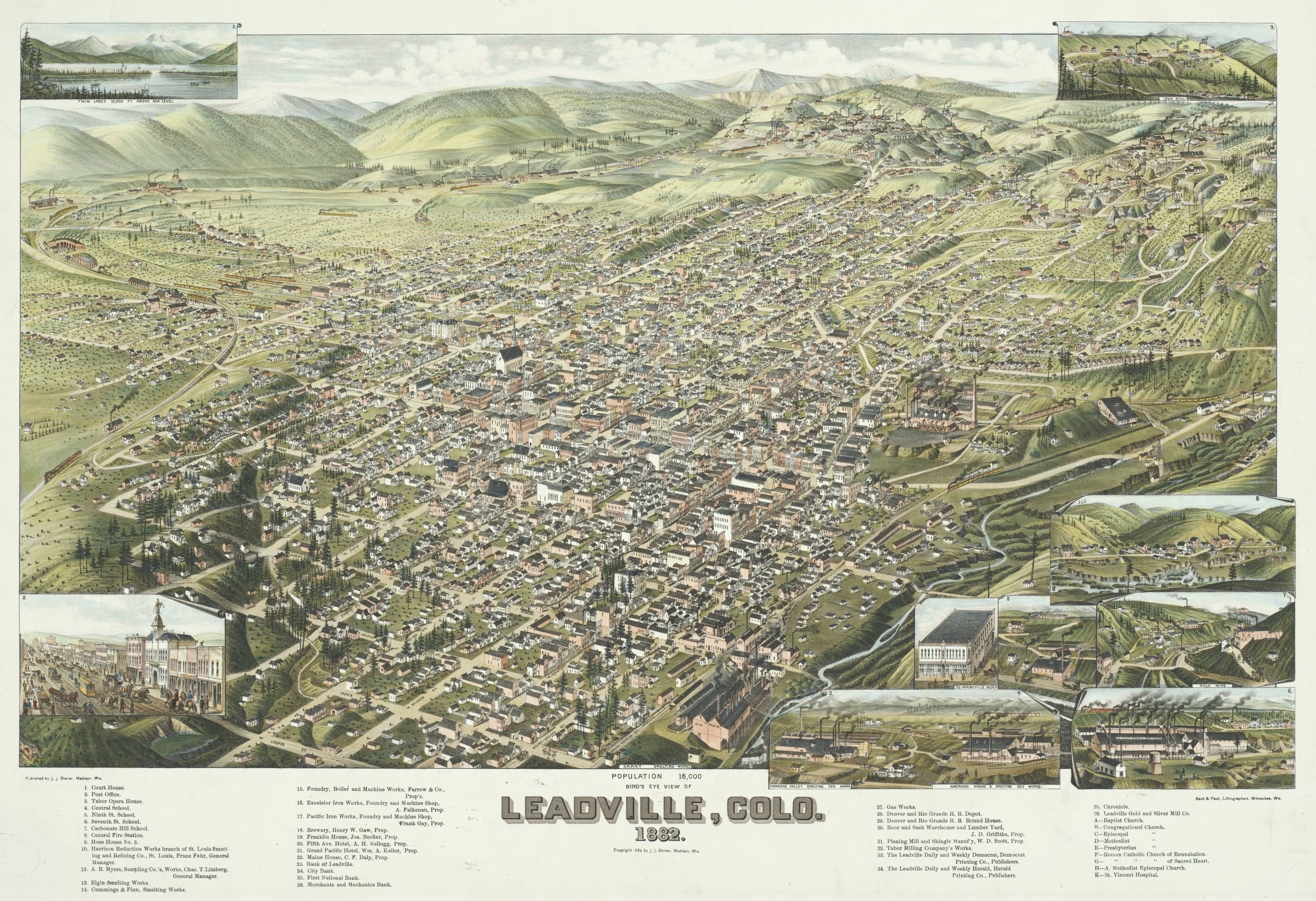
Bird's eye view of Leadville, Colo. 1882.

== Timeline ==
| Year(s) | # Yrs. | Team | Level | League | Ballpark |
|---|---|---|---|---|---|
| 1885 | 1 | Leadville Blues | Independent | Colorado State League | Leadville Base Ball Park |
| 1886 | 1 | Leadville Blues | Independent | Western League | Leadville Base Ball Park |
| 1889, 1895 | 2 | Leadville Blues | Independent | Colorado State League | Leadville Base Ball Park |
| 1896 | 1 | Leadville Angels | Independent | Colorado State League | Leadville Base Ball Park |
| 1898 | 1 | Leadville Blues | Independent | Colorado State League | Leadville Base Ball Park |

== Year–by–year records ==
| Year | Record | Finish | Manager | Playoffs/Notes |
|---|---|---|---|---|
| 1885 | 7–13 | 3rd | John Morgan / N. T. Thornes | No playoffs held |
| 1886 | 39–41 | 3rd | D. W. Morgan | No playoffs held |
| 1889 | 19–31 | 4th | Deacon White / Butch Blake / John Foutz | No playoffs held |
| 1895 | 00–00 | NA | NA | 1895 league records unknown |
| 1896 | 5–3 | 2nd | Harry Grier | No playoffs held |
| 1898 | 00–00 | NA | Harry Grier | 1898 team record unknown |

== Notable alumni ==
- George Baker (1889)
- Mike Corcoran (1885)
- Warren Fitzgerald (1889)
- Dave Foutz (1882)
- Billy Hart (1886)
- Nat Hudson (1885)
- Billy Klusman (1886)
- Pete Lohman (1889)
- Lou Meyers (1886)
- Frank Pears (1889)
- Harry Salisbury (1885)
- Ed Siever (1898)
- Pat Sullivan (1885)
- Bill Van Dyke (1885)
- Alex Voss (1886)
- Milt Whitehead (1885)

== See also ==
- Leadville Blues players
