= Isabel Lancaster Eckles =

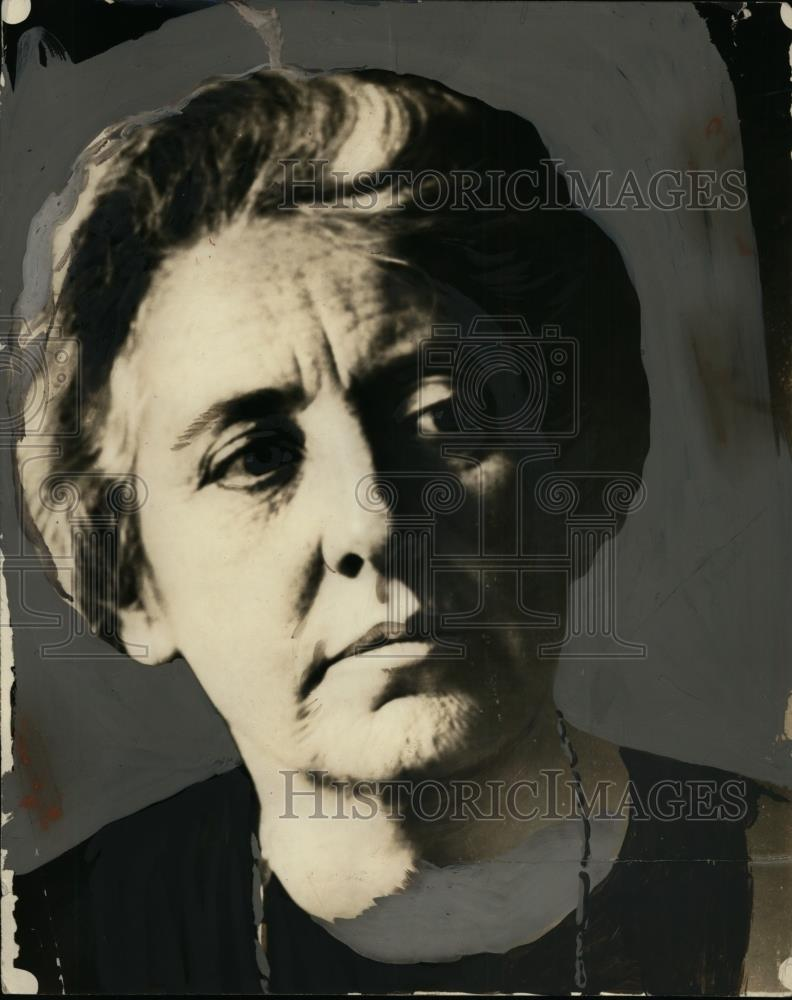
Isabel Lancaster Eckles

Isabel Lancaster Eckles (September 8, 1877 - January 25, 1971) was the State Superintendent of Public Instruction for New Mexico.

== Early life ==
Isabel Lancaster Eckles was born on September 8, 1877, in New Castle, Delaware, the daughter of Samuel H. Eckles (1842-1902) and Mary N. Eckles (1842-1909). With the family, she moved to New Mexico in 1886.

== Career ==
She was the Superintendent of City Schools in Santa Fe, New Mexico. She was a teacher, registrar, and acting president of the State Teachers' College in Silver City, New Mexico, from 1919 to 1922. For seven years she was the County Superintendent of Schools for Grant County, New Mexico. She was the State Superintendent of Public Instruction for New Mexico from 1923 to 1927.

She was a member of New Mexico State Board of Education from 1927 to 1931. She was the director of the Santa Fe Fiesta. She was an honorary member of the American Woman's Association of New York.

She was a member of the Silver City Woman's Club and the Santa Fe Woman's Club.

After retirement, she served as State Director for the Division of Service Projects for the Works Progress Administration, later the Work Projects Administration. She was instrumental in founding the museums at Roswell and Silver City.

== Personal life ==
Isabel Lancaster Eckles lived at 225 Shelby St., Santa Fe, New Mexico.

She died on January 25, 1971, and is buried at Fairview Cemetery (Santa Fe, New Mexico).

== Legacy ==
The Isabel L. Eckles Collection, 1898-1966, is preserved at Museum of New Mexico, Fray Angélico Chávez History Library.
