= Fairview Cemetery (Santa Fe, New Mexico) =

- U.S. National Register of Historic Places
- U.S. Historic district
- NM State Register of Cultural Properties
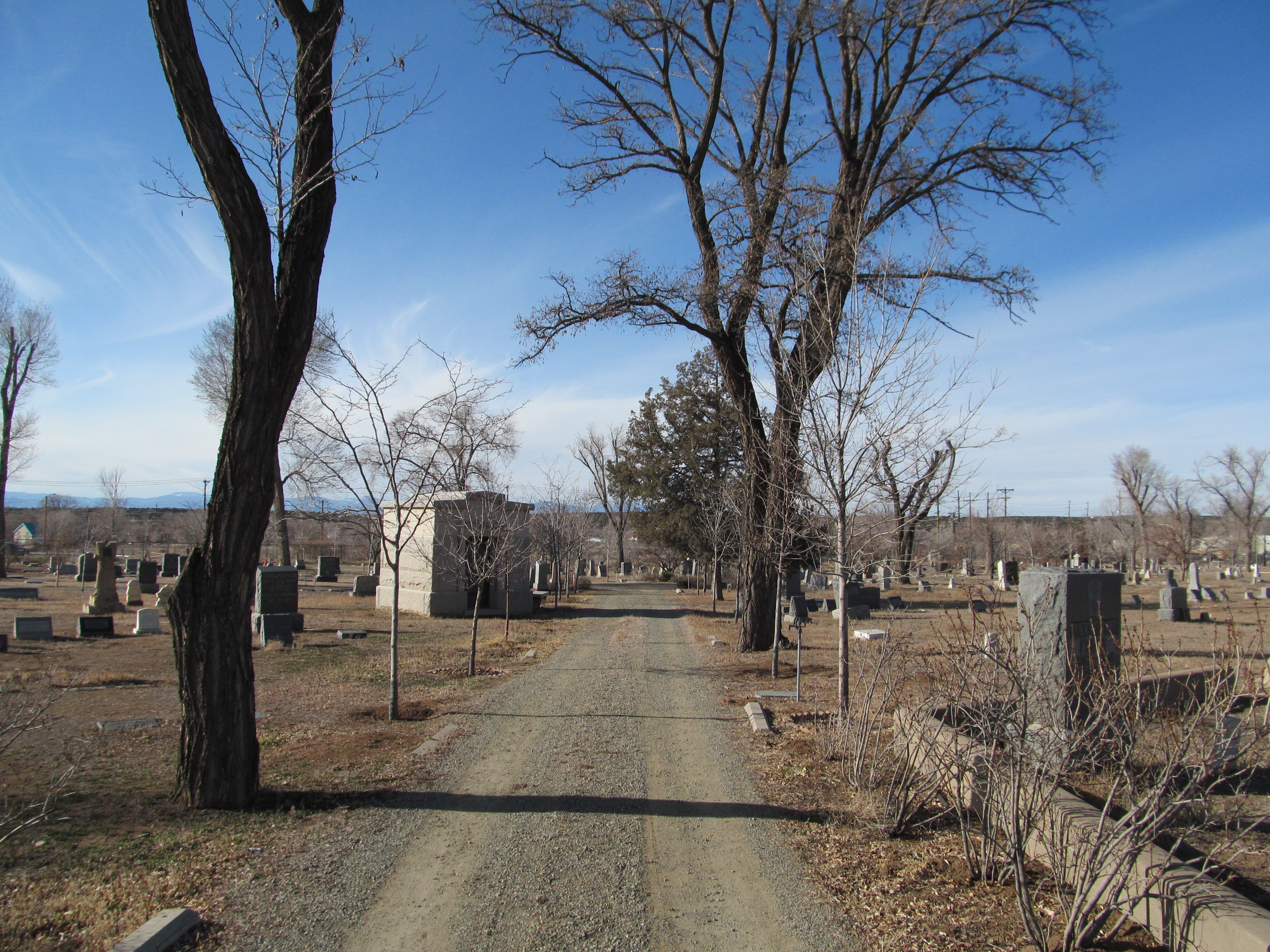
- Fairview Cemetery

- Location within New Mexico Location within the United States
- Location: 1134 Cerrillos Rd. Santa Fe, New Mexico
- Coordinates: 35°40′31″N 105°57′32″W
- Area: 4 acres (1.6 ha)
- Built: 1884
- Architectural style: Pueblo
- NRHP reference No.: 04001517
- NMSRCP No.: 1873

Significant dates
- Added to NRHP: January 20, 2005
- Designated NMSRCP: October 8, 2004

Fairview Cemetery is a graveyard in Santa Fe, New Mexico. It was for many years the only non-Catholic cemetery in the city. There are roughly 3,700 people buried there. The graveyard is listed on the National Register of Historic Places.

== History ==
The graveyard was established in its current location during the 1880s by James T. Newhall and Preston H. Kuhn. As declared in the opening entry of the Fairview Cemetery Company minutes, "The necessity of having and maintaining a proper place for burial of the dead in the town of Santa Fe, N. M., being apparent, Mr. James T. Newhall and Mr. Preston H. Kuhn made an estimate of the amount that would be required for the purpose ..." The oldest gravestones date to the 1860s, belonging to people who were originally buried in the Masonic and Odd Fellows graveyard which used to be in downtown Santa Fe. Most of these bodies were moved to Fairview during the period 1895–1901.

Many Santa Fe residents who were prominent in their day are interred at Fairview, including Sylvanus Morley (1883–1948), Gerald Cassidy (1869–1934), Thomas B. Catron (1840–1921), Isabel Lancaster Eckles (1877–1971), Maximilian Frost (1852–1909), Luis Gold (1820–1880), Joseph Hersch (1822–1901), Napoleon Laughlin (1844–1924), Frank E. Mera, MD (1870–1970), Miguel Antonio Otero (1859–1944), John Pflueger (1864–1961), William J. Slaughter (1858–1905), Abraham Staab (1839–1913), Julia Staab (1844–1896), William Thornton (1843–1916), and Carlos Vierra (1876–1937).

The cemetery is now operated as a nonprofit organization by the Fairview Cemetery Preservation Association (FCPA). The FCPA holds its annual clean-up event in mid-May each year, followed by a general membership meeting. In early 2013, Fairview Cemetery staff oversaw construction of a cement wall several feet above and below grade to limit prairie dog intrusion into the cemetery.

== See also ==
- National Register of Historic Places listings in Santa Fe County, New Mexico
- List of cemeteries in New Mexico
