= Rocky Mountain League =

Minor league baseball league

- Classification: Class D (1912)
- Sport: Minor League Baseball
- First season: 1912
- Folded: July 5, 1912
- President: Ira Bidwell (1912)
- No. of teams: 4
- Country: United States of America
- Last champions: 1 Cheyenne Indians (1912)

The Rocky Mountain League was a minor league baseball league that operated in 1912. The Class D level league featured teams based in Colorado, New Mexico and Wyoming. The short–lived Rocky Mountain League folded during the 1912 season.

== History ==
The Rocky Mountain League formed in 1912 as a four–team Class D level league under the direction of league president Ira Bidwell. Bidwell also served as manager of the Cheyenne franchise in the league.

The four–team league began play on May 4, 1912. During the season, only the La Junta Railroaders franchise remained in place. The Canon City Swastikas moved to Raton, New Mexico on June 4, 1912. The Pueblo, Colorado team moved to Trinidad, Colorado on June 8, 1912 then moved again to become the Cheyenne Indians on June 28, 1912. The Colorado Springs Millionaires moved to become the Dawson Stags on June 15, 1912.

The league permanently folded on July 5, 1912. On that date the Cheyenne Indians (22–7) were in 1st place in the standings, 4.5 games ahead of the 2nd place Raton (20–14) team. They were followed by the Dawson Stags (10–20) and LaJunta Railroaders (11–22) in the final standings.

== Rocky Mountain League teams ==
Team name	City represented	Ballpark	Year
Cañon City Swastikas	Cañon City, Colorado	Centennial Park	1912
Cheyenne Indians	Cheyenne, Wyoming	Unknown	1912
Colorado Springs Millionaires	Colorado Springs, Colorado	Millionaire Field	1912
Dawson Stags	Dawson, New Mexico	Unknown	1912
La Junta Railroaders	La Junta, Colorado	La Junta City Park	1912
Pueblo	Pueblo, Colorado	Unknown	1912
Raton	Raton, New Mexico	Unknown	1912
Trinidad	Trinidad, Colorado	Unknown	1912

== 1912 Rocky Mountain League standings ==
Team standings	W	L	PCT	GB	Managers
Pueblo / Trinidad / Cheyenne Indians	22	7	.759	--	John Galena / Ira Bidwell
Canon City Swastikas / Raton Swastikas	20	14	.588	4.5	Jack Farrell
Colorado Springs Millionaires / Dawson Stags	10	20	.333	12.5	C.H. Brammell
La Junta Railroaders	11	22	.333	13	Bill Annis / Red Waller / Tubby Graves
