= John Kerr (baseball) =

American baseball player (1898–1993)

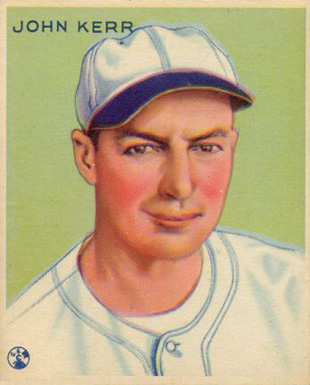
- 1933 Goudey baseball card.
- Second baseman
- Born: November 26, 1898; San Francisco, California, U.S.
- Died: October 19, 1993 (aged 94); Long Beach, California, U.S.
- Batted: Right Threw: Right

MLB debut
- May 1, 1923, for the Detroit Tigers

Last MLB appearance
- September 30, 1934, for the Washington Senators

MLB statistics
- Batting average: .266
- Home runs: 6
- Runs batted in: 145
- Stats at Baseball Reference

Teams
- Detroit Tigers (1923–1924); Chicago White Sox (1929–1931); Washington Senators (1932–1934)

John Francis Kerr (November 26, 1898 – October 19, 1993) was an American professional baseball player. He played all or part of eight seasons in Major League Baseball between 1923 and 1934 with the Detroit Tigers, Chicago White Sox, and the Washington Senators in the American League, primarily as a second baseman.

== Early career ==
Kerr made his professional baseball debut in 1923. He split that season and 1924 between the Tigers and the minor leagues, then went out west to the Pacific Coast League in 1925. After playing one season with the Salt Lake City Bees and three more with the Hollywood Stars, he was drafted by the White Sox in the 1928 rule 5 draft.

== White Sox ==
Kerr became the White Sox starting second baseman in 1929, replacing Bill Hunnefield, who would be traded to the Toledo Mud Hens in midseason. He batted .258 in his first full major league season, hitting his first major league home run on August 21 off New York Yankees pitcher Ed Wells.

Kerr missed parts of the 1930 season with various injuries, winding up as the backup middle infielder behind Bill Cissell and Greg Mulleavy. However, he returned to starting in 1931, batting .268 with a career-high 50 runs batted in. After the season, he was traded to the Senators with outfielder Carl Reynolds in exchange for pitchers Bump Hadley and Sad Sam Jones, as well as infielder Jackie Hayes, who would replace him as the starting second baseman.

== Later career ==
Kerr spent the next three seasons on the Senators' bench behind second baseman Buddy Myer and future Hall of Fame shortstop Joe Cronin. During his tenure in Washington, he never played more than 51 games. He was on the Senators roster in 1933 when they lost in the World Series to the New York Giants. Kerr's sole appearance came in the finale (Game 5) when he pinch ran for centerfielder Fred Schulte with 2 out in the bottom of the 10th inning. In 1935, he served as a coach for the Senators, but in 1936 he became a player-manager in the Boston Red Sox organization.

In 471 games over eight major league seasons, Kerr posted a .266 batting average (388-for-1457) with 172 runs, 6 home runs, 145 RBI and 115 bases on balls. He finished his career with a .966 fielding percentage playing at second and third base and shortstop.

He spent the next five seasons playing and managing in the minor leagues. He managed in the Class B Western International League from 1937 to 1940. The first 3 seasons were with the Vancouver Maple Leafs, he was then hired to manage the Wenatchee Chiefs, a New York Yankees affiliate. His final season in baseball was 1941 when he managed and played second base for the Cheyenne Indians of the Class D Western League.
