= Dawson, New Mexico =

- Ghost town
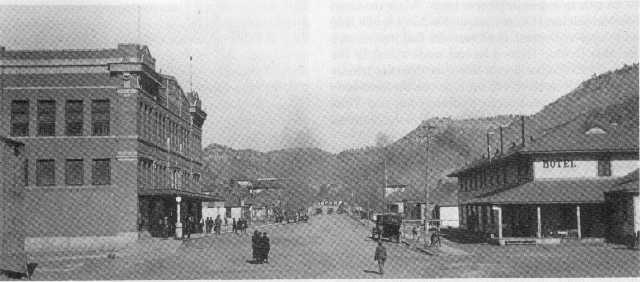
- Main Street Dawson, 1916

- Location within the state of New Mexico Dawson (the United States)
- Coordinates: 36°39′51″N 104°46′29″W
- Country: United States
- State: New Mexico
- County: Colfax
- Elevation: 6,339 ft (1,932 m)
- Time zone: UTC-7 (Mountain (MST))
  - Summer (DST): UTC-6 (MDT)
- GNIS feature ID: 902230

Dawson (also Mountview) is a ghost town in Colfax County, New Mexico, United States. Dawson is located approximately 17 miles (27 km) northeast of Cimarron, and was the site of two separate coal mining disasters in 1913 and 1923. In 1950, the mines were closed, and by 1954 the last residents had left and the post office closed.

== History ==
Dawson and its area were part of the Maxwell Land Grant. In the late 1860s, Lucien B. Maxwell sold more than 24,000 acres (97 km^{2}) of land to John Barkley Dawson for $3,700. Dawson and his brother L.S. Dawson settled on the Vermijo River in 1867. The Maxwell Land Grant Company later attempted to evict Dawson, but his ownership of the land was confirmed by a court in 1901.

Coal was discovered on the land in 1895, and in 1901, Dawson sold the land to C.B. Eddy for $400,000. Eddy and associates created the Dawson Fuel Company and constructed the Dawson Railroad from Tucumcari to the site of the mines. In 1905, Eddy sold the mines and railroad to the Phelps Dodge Company. Phelps Dodge main interest was in the coking quality of the coal, which made it suitable for steelmaking, which was one of the company's business interests at the time.

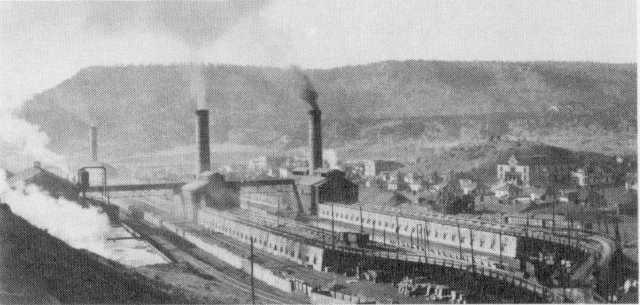
The Coke Ovens in Dawson, 1920

The corporation needed to attract workers to the remote location, so they built homes for the miners, along with numerous other facilities, including a hospital, department store, swimming pool, movie theater, and a golf course. With these amenities, Phelps Dodge was able to maintain a stable employment rate despite the inherent dangers of mining and the isolation of northern New Mexico. Many of the miners were recent immigrants. Dawson grew to have a population of 6,000 in 1913.

In total, the Dawson coal operations had ten mines, numbered 1–10, in the immediate vicinity of Dawson. The mines are generally referred to as "Stag Canyon #", a reference to the operating company, but they are also often referred to as "Dawson Mine #", in reference to their locale. Different web pages which use GNIS data have Dawson Mine No. 5 as being located eight miles (13 km) north of the other mines. In looking at other source documents found in Google Books, this appears to be an error. The actual Dawson Mine No. 5 was located along the Vermejo River, near the town of Lauretta.

Several of these mines were connected to the coal processing and loading facilities in Dawson by means of an electric-powered narrow gauge (36 inches (910 mm) gauge) railroad. This railroad was apparently 6,600 feet (2,000 meters) in length, running along Rail Canyon from the entries of Mines 1, 2, 3, 4 and 6. Mines 5 and 7 also connected to this line through underground connections to the other mines, but they also had their own tipples. Cars would be loaded inside the mines, taken outside, and then transported in trains of cars to the facilities in Dawson proper. This line served the No. 1 & 2 Tipples, located in Rail Canyon.

Mines 8, 9, and 10 are located to the SW of the town of Dawson, and early research indicates that they had their own mine tipple for coal cleaning and loading into standard gauge railroad cars for delivery to customers. These three mines also had an electric-powered railroad inside them, which led to their own tipple, but they apparently were not connected to the other mines.

The coal was cleaned of non-combustible debris and sorted into general sizes for different uses. In addition to the coal processing facilities, there were also coking ovens which processed the coal, transforming it into coke, which was used for metal processing by Phelps Dodge at other facilities. The coking ovens produced carbon monoxide gas, which was captured and then burned to create steam for generating electricity for mine machinery and electric lighting, both in the mines and in the towns around the mines.

The Dawson Railway was purchased by Phelps Dodge at the same time and made part of its El Paso and Southwestern Railroad system. The EP&SW was later purchased by the Southern Pacific Railroad, which also purchased long-term contracts for coal production from Dawson. The SP used steam locomotives, which were mostly fueled by oil, but the operating division located at Tucumcari utilized coal fueled steam engines, the only group of such locomotives on their roster.

In 1912, Dawson was home to minor league baseball. The Dawson Stags became members of the four-team Class D level Rocky Mountain League during the season. The league started the season with the Cañon City Swastikas, Colorado Springs Millionaires, La Junta Railroaders and Pueblo Indians beginning Rocky Mountain League play. During the season, the Colorado Springs franchise relocated to Dawson on June 15, 1912. The Rocky Mountain League permanently folded after the 1912 season.

=== Disasters ===
On October 22, 1913, Dawson suffered its first major disaster. Stag Canyon Mine No. 2 was shaken by an explosion that was felt two miles (3.2 km) away in the town proper. Relief teams rushed in from surrounding communities and as far away as Pittsburg, Kansas and Rock Springs, Wyoming, but of the 286 men who arrived to work in the Stag Canyon mine that morning, only 23 survived. Most of the 263 killed were Hispanics and foreign-born Italians and Greeks; 146 were Italian and 36 were Greek. One of the surviving miners was George Mavroidis who witnessed 16 men around him lose their lives before he himself lost consciousness. He woke up the next morning in the mine office.

Phelps Dodge sent a special train from El Paso, Texas, with doctors and nurses, but to no avail. Two rescuers died during the rescue effort. It was later determined that the explosion was caused by a dynamite charge set off while the mine was in general operation, igniting coal dust in the mine. This was in violation of mining safety laws. The other mines remained productive after the disaster in Mine No. 2.

In 1923, another mine explosion killed 123 miners: On February 8, Stag Canyon Mine No. 1 suffered an explosion. A mine car derailed, knocking down timbers and the electric trolley cable, causing sparks and igniting coal dust in the mine. many of them descendants of the men who died in 1913.

=== Shutdown ===
Dawson did not become a ghost town until 1950, when the Phelps Dodge Corporation shut down the mines. At closure, Mine 6 was the largest producer, and several other mines had been previously closed out because of declining demand. The closures were also due in large part to the completion of the twenty-five year coal contract with the Southern Pacific Railroad. The entire town was sold or razed, with some of the miners' houses moved to other locations.

The Southern Pacific branch to Tucumcari was lifted at about the same time. But in 1965 the northern portion of the roadbed was used by the Santa Fe Railroad, for new tracks continuing up the canyon through Dawson plus an additional 15 miles or 24.1 km (approximately) to a new mine in York Canyon. This open-pit mine was initially operated by Kaiser Steel, with their output being transported to their steel mill at Fontana, California. The York Canyon mine was operated by several different companies, finally closing in the early 2000s. As of 2016, the track remained in place.

== Description ==
The town of Dawson is now largely gone, with only a few buildings remaining. The tall smoke stacks of the coking ovens were eventually demolished in the early 2000s because they represented a liability to the current owner of the property.

The only significant landmark remaining in Dawson is the Dawson Cemetery, which is on the National Register of Historic Places. The cemetery is filled with iron crosses painted white, marking the graves of many miners who died in the mines. Other markers show the burial locations of other residents of Dawson.

Dawson can be reached by taking Route 64 approximately 12 miles (19 km) east of Cimarron and then heading north onto A38 at the striped sign and proceeding on that road for another 5 miles (8.0 km). After A38 crosses the adjacent railroad tracks a second time, turn onto the dirt road on the right (which proceeds east of A38 for approximately 1,000 feet (300 meters)) to reach the site of the Dawson cemetery. The ruins of Dawson can be seen by continuing north on A38, which turns into Barus Road and then splits into Lauretta Road and Rail Canyon Road.

== Notable people ==
- Dolores Huerta (1930–2026), labor leader and activist and Presidential Medal of Freedom recipient, was born in Dawson.
- John Wirth (1936–2002)
