= La Junta Railroaders =

- 1912; La Junta, Colorado

Minor league affiliations
- Class: Class D (1912)
- League: Rocky Mountain League (1912)

Major league affiliations
- Team: None

Minor league titles
- League titles (0): None

Team data
- Name: La Junta Railroaders (1912)
- Ballpark: City Park (1912)

The La Junta Railroaders were a minor league baseball team based in La Junta, Colorado. The Railroaders played in the 1912 season as members of the Class D level Rocky Mountain League. La Junta hosted home games at City Park.

== History ==
In 1912, minor league baseball began in La Junta, Colorado, when the La Junta "Railroaders" became charter members of the four–team Class D level Rocky Mountain League. The league started the season with the Cañon City Swastikas, Colorado Springs Millionaires and Pueblo Indians teams joining the La Junta Railroaders in Rocky Mountain League play.

The "Railroaders" moniker corresponds to local industry, with the city of La Junta located along the railroad line and the founding of the city being tied to the railroad access. Both freight and passenger trains accessed La Junta, which had a large rail yard, as well as a passenger depot built in 1895 called the El Otero. Today, the rail yard is still utilized by BNSF and the La Junta station serves Amtrak passengers.

Before the 1912 season was scheduled to conclude, the Rocky Mountain League permanently folded on July 5, 1912. The La Junta Railroaders were in fourth place with a 11–22 record when the league disbanded. The Railroaders finished 13.0 games behind the first place Pueblo/Cheyenne Indians team in the final standings. The La Junta Railroaders were managed by J.F. Waller, Bill Annis and Tubby Graves. At the time he managed La Junta, Tubby Graves was serving as the head football, basketball and baseball coach at Alabama. La Junta was the only Rocky Mountain League franchise that did not relocate during the season.

After 1912, La Junta has not hosted another minor league team.

== The ballpark ==
The 1912 La Junta Railroaders played minor league home games at City Park. City Park was established in 1905 and is still in use today as a public park. The park is located at 10th Street and Colorado Avenue in La Junta, Colorado.

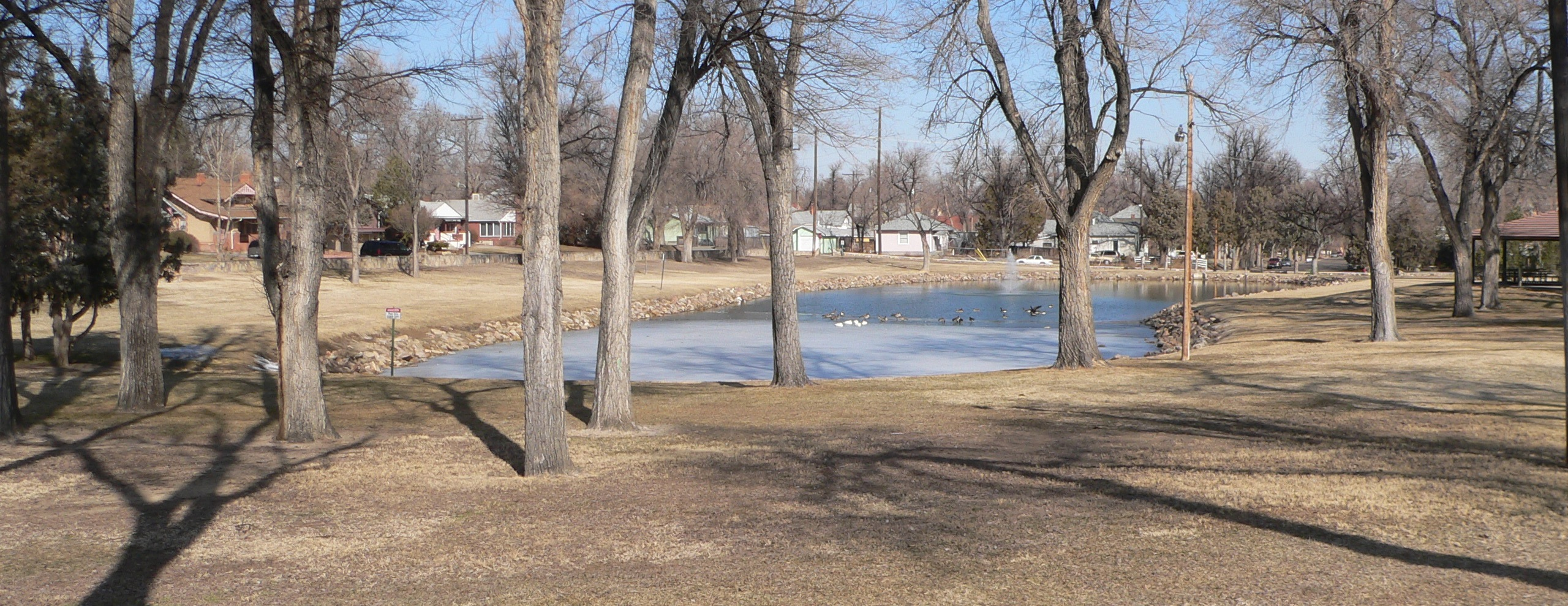
(2012) Lake in La Junta City Park. Located between Park and Colorado Avenues and between 10th and 14th Streets. La Junta, Colorado

== Timeline ==
Year(s)	# Yrs.	Team	Level	League
1912	1	La Junta Railroaders	Class D	Rocky Mountain League

== Year–by–year records ==
Year	Record	Finish	Manager	Playoffs/Notes
1912	11–22	4th	J.F. Waller / Bill Annis /Tubby Graves	League folded July 5

== Notable alumni ==
- Bill Annis (1912, MGR)
- Tubby Graves (1912, MGR)
- J.F. Waller (1912, MGR)
- Complete roster information for the 1912 La Junta Railroaders is unknown.
