= Colorado State League =

The Colorado State League was an unaffiliated minor league baseball league that played between 1885 and 1898 involving teams from Colorado. Notable participants included the Leadville Blues, who were members of the league in multiple seasons, including 1885, 1889, and 1898. The league disbanded after the 1898 season, with Aspen’s team folding mid-season despite leading the standings.

== Cities represented ==
- Aspen, CO: Aspen Silver Kings 1889; Aspen Miners 1896, 1898-1899
- Colorado Springs, CO: Colorado Springs 1889, 1896
- Denver, CO: Denver Solis 1889; Denver Gulfs 1896, 1898
- Fort Collins, CO: Fort Collins Farmers 1898
- Gillett, CO: Gillett 1896
- Glenwood Springs, CO: Glenwood Springs Bathers 1898
- Leadville, CO: Leadville Blues 1889, 1898-1899 Leadville Angels 1896
- Louisville, CO: Louisville Coal Miners 1898
- Pueblo, CO: Pueblo Ponies 1889; Pueblo Rovers 1896, 1898-1899

== Standings & statistics ==
1889 Colorado State League
President: Henry S. Woodruff

Team standings	W	L	PCT	GB	Managers
Pueblo Ponies (Note: Pueblo disbanded on July 22)	37	21	.638	-	E.R. Alden / George Bowman / DeRemer
Colorado Springs	41	34	.547	3½	Don Goddard
Aspen Silver Kings (Note: Aspen disbanded on July 29)	25	30	.455	10½	Ford
Leadville Blues	19	31	.380	14	White/Blake/John Foutz
Denver Solis (Note: Denver disbanded on June 2)	12	18	.400	NA	James McLaughlin

1898 Colorado State League
President: A. Magnam

Team standings	W	L	PCT	GB	Managers
Aspen Miners (Note: Aspen disbanded on July 31)	35	21	.625	-	A. Magnam
Louisville Coal Miners (Note: Louisville disbanded on July 7)	10	11	.476	NA	Thomas Hilton
Leadville Blues	NA	NA	NA	NA	Harry Grier
Glenwood Springs Bathers	NA	NA	NA	NA	C.M. Keck
Denver Gulfs	NA	NA	NA	NA	Burt Davis
Fort Collins Farmers (Note: Fort Collins disbanded on August 24)	NA	NA	NA	NA	Frank Abbott/ E. Avery
Pueblo Rovers (Note: Pueblo disbanded on May 30)	1	2	.333	NA	Frank Hoffman

Player statistics

Player	Team	Stat	Tot
Bartley Reed	Denver	BA	.436
