= Colorado Springs Millionaires =

- 1889–1916; (1889, 1896, 1901-1905, 1912, 1916); Colorado Springs, Colorado

Minor league affiliations
- Previous classes: Class-A (1916); Class-D (1912); Class-A (1901-1905)
- Previous leagues: Western League (1916); Rocky Mountain League (1912); Western League (1901-1905); Colorado State League (1889, 1896)

Team data
- Previous names: Colorado Springs Millionaires (1901-1905, 1912, 1916); Colorado Springs (1889, 1896)

The Colorado Springs Millionaires were a minor league baseball team, based in Colorado Springs, Colorado that played primarily in the Western League.

== History ==
The first Colorado Springs team played in the Colorado State League in 1889 and 1896. The Millionaires were formed in 1901 and played through 1905 when they moved to Pueblo, Colorado to become the Pueblo Indians. The Millionaires returned in 1912 in the Rocky Mountain League but they moved at mid-season to Dawson, New Mexico and became the Dawson Stags. The final version of the team played in 1916 in the Western League when the Wichita Witches briefly relocated to Colorado Springs.

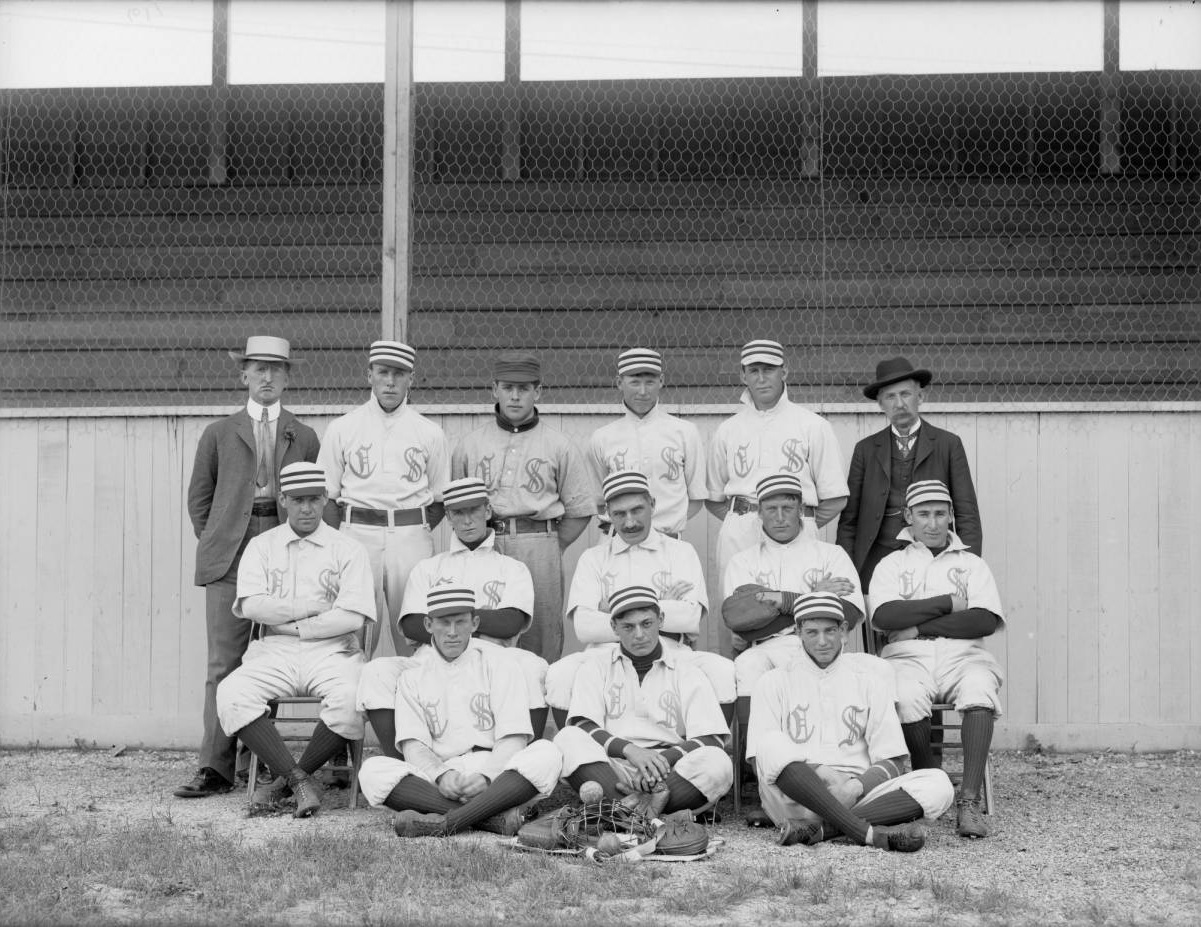
The Colorado Springs Millionaires in 1901.
