= Denver Bears (Western League) =

- 1885–1954; (1885–1891, 1895–1896, 1898, 1900–1917, 1922–1932, 1941, 1947–1954); Denver, Colorado

Minor league affiliations
- Previous classes: Class-A (1947–1954); Class-D (1941); Class-A (1901–1917, 1922–1932); Class- B (1895, 1900)
- Previous leagues: Western League (1901–1917, 1922–1932, 1941, 1947–1954); Western League (1900); Colorado State League (1896, 1898); Western Association (1890–1891, 1895); Colorado State League (1889); Western Association (1889); Western League (1886–1888); Colorado State League (1885)

Major league affiliations
- Previous teams: Pittsburgh Pirates (1952–1954); Boston Braves (1949–1951); New York Yankees (1947); St. Louis Cardinals (1932)

Minor league titles
- Class titles: 1900, 1911, 1912, 1913, 1952

Team data
- Previous names: Denver Bears (1913–1917, 1922–1932, 1941, 1947–1954); Denver Grizzlies (1898, 1900–1912); Denver Gulfs (1896); Denver (1895); Denver Mountaineers (1890–1891); Denver Grizzlies (1889–1890); Denver Solis (1889); Denver Mountaineers (1888–1889); Denver Mountain Lions (1886–1888); Denver (1885)

The Denver Bears (also periodically known as the Grizzlies, Mountaineers or Mountain Lions) were a minor league baseball team from Denver, Colorado, that played primarily in the Western League. They were founded in 1885 and played in the Colorado State League before moving to the Western League a year later and also adopting a team name. The franchise began playing at Larimer Street Baseball Park and played at a few other ballparks before ultimately moving to Mile High Stadium. The 1911 Grizzlies were recognized as one of the 100 greatest minor league teams of all time. The Bears were affiliated with four MLB teams from 1932 to 1954 before being replaced in 1955 by an American Association team of the same name that would eventually relocate to New Orleans, Louisiana, in 1993.

== History ==
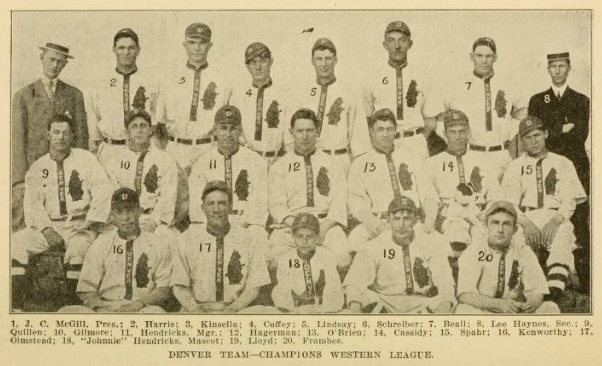
The 1911 Denver Grizzlies

== Notable alumni ==
Joe Tinker
