= Pueblo Indians (baseball) =

- 1885–1912; (1885, 1889, 1891, 1895–1896, 1898, 1900, 1905–1909, 1911–1912); Pueblo, Colorado

Minor league affiliations
- Previous classes: Class D (1912); Class A (1905–1909, 1911); Class B (1900)
- League: Rocky Mountain League (1912); Western League (1900, 1905–1909, 1911); Colorado State League (1885, 1889, 1891, 1895–1896, 1898)

Team data
- Previous names: Pueblo Indians (1900, 1905–1909, 1911–1912); Pueblo Rovers (1896); Pueblo Ponies (1889); Pueblo Pastimes (1885)

The Pueblo Indians were a minor league baseball team that was located in Pueblo, Colorado and played in the Western League sporadically from 1900 to 1911.

A Pueblo franchise had previously played in the Colorado State League on and off from 1885 to 1898 and they joined the second Western League when it formed in 1900 but folded that season. The name returned when the Colorado Springs Millionaires moved to town and became the Indians in 1905, and they remained active until 1909. In 1911 the Wichita Jobbers moved to Pueblo and finished out the season as the Indians. This team moved to the Rocky Mountain League in 1912 but quickly moved to Trinidad during the season.
