= Minden (minor league baseball) =

- 1903; Minden, Nebraska

Minor league affiliations
- Class: Independent (1903)
- League: Central Nebraska League (1903)

Major league affiliations
- Team: None

Minor league titles
- League titles (0): None

Team data
- Name: Minden (1903)
- Ballpark: Minden Grounds (1903)

The Minden team was a minor league baseball team based in Minden, Nebraska. In 1903, the "Minden" team played as charter members of the five-team independent Central Nebraska League in the league's only season of play. Minden was without a formal nickname, common in the era. The Minden team placed fifth in the Central Nebraska League final standings.

Minden hosted its 1903 minor league home games at the Minden Grounds.

== History ==
In the 1903 season, Minden, became charter members of the short–lived five-team Central Nebraska League, which played as an Independent level league. The Central Nebraska League played as a five–team league during their one season of minor league play.

The five members of the 1903 Central Nebraska League included Minden, who were joined by the Nebraska-based teams of Giltner, Holdrege Silver Aces, McCook and the Red Cloud Indians in league play. The 1903 "Minden" team was without a formal nickname, as was common in the era.

Minden started the 1903 season with a 0–4 record in standings published on June 17, 1903. Beginning the season, the league called itself the Southwestern Nebraska Baseball League in the published standings.

On June 15, 1903, Minden lost a home game to McCook by a score of 5–0. Sam Leatherby pitched for Minden in the loss. White was the Minden catcher. The game was played in 1:15.

McCook again defeated Minden on June 16, 1903, in a game at Minden. Ollie Ahlin pitched for Minden in a 6–4 loss, with 8 strikeouts. White was the Minden catcher.

Minden improved to an overall record of 3–4 in the league standings published on June 26, 1903.

On July 1, 1903, Giltner defeated Minden 6–0. On July 2, 1903, Giltner again defeated Minden by a score of 7–3.

In Central Nebraska League standings published on July 3, 1903, Minden had a 3–7 record and were in fourth place in the five–team league. Minden had a 3–11 record in the July 10, 1903 standings, remaining in fourth place.

On the 4th of July 1903, Holdrege and Minden played a doubleheader at Minden, with Minden winning both games. It was noted the games were the most attended at Minden. Minden won the first game by a score of 3–0 and the second game 10–4. In previous games in the series, Holdrege defeated Minden by scores of 6–3 and 11–10.

Minden defeated Giltner by a score of 9–6 on Friday July 17, 1903.

On Monday, July 20, 1903, at a home game, Minden was defeated by McCook 9–3. Bates pitched for Minden with 5 strikeouts and 6 walks, pitching to White at catcher. Minden had three runs on nine hits in the loss, in a game with one umpire.

McCook defeated Minden again on July 21. Playing at home, Minden was defeated 7–0. Sam Letheby pitched for Minden and had 7 strikeouts, with White at catcher in the loss.

On July 22, 1903, Minden played an Arapahoe, Nebraska team, losing the non-league game by the score of 6–0.

The last Central Nebraska League standings were published on July 24, 1903, shortly before Minden disbanded, along with Giltner. The last published standings showed Minden in fifth place with a 7–15 record, 12.0 games behind first place Holdredge and McCook, who both had 19–7 records on that date. Red Cloud and McCook disbanded shortly after Minden and Giltner, leaving only Holdrege, who became a traveling team to finish the season.

The 1903 Central Nebraska League folded on August 4, 1903, after a game between Holden and McCook. Holdredge was scheduled to continue play teams in Iowa after the folding of the league. Holdrege added Ollie Ahlin and Bobby Gaines, two "well known" players from the Minden team to its roster after Minden folded with the Central Nebraska League.

The Central Nebraska League permanently folded after the 1903 season, Minden included. Minden, Nebraska has not hosted another minor league team.

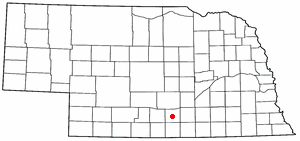
Minden, Nebraska location

== The ballpark ==
The Minden home ballpark was referred to as the "Minden Grounds." With the Chautauqua Park as the only known park in Minden in the era, the ballpark was likely located within. Numerous Chautauqua parks were reported to have been built in the region in 1902, with the Kearney County Chautauqua Association owning the parcel in Minden. Chautauqua Park is the oldest public park in Minden. The park is still in use today with a historic bandshell, located at 7th Street and Minden Avenue, Minden, Nebraska.

== Year-by-year record ==
Year	Record	Finish	Manager	Playoffs/Notes
1903	7–15	5th	NA	Record published through July 24

== Notable alumni ==
No alumni of the 1903 Minden team advanced to the major leagues.
