= Franz Lidz =

American writer (born 1951)

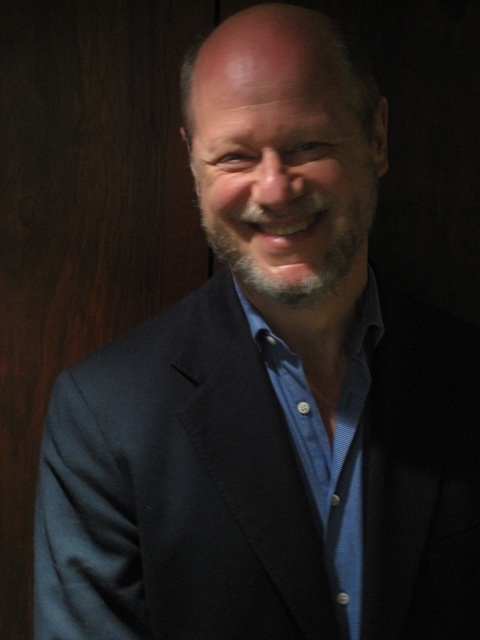
- Lidz in 2009
- Born: Franz Ira Lidz; September 24, 1951 (age 75); New York City, U.S.
- Education: Antioch College
- Occupations: Journalist; memoirist; American professional basketball executive
- Spouse: Maggie Lidz (1976–present)
- Children: Gogo, Daisy
- Writing career
- Notable works: Unstrung Heroes (1991); Ghosty Men (2003); Fairway To Hell (2008)

Franz Lidz (born September 24, 1951) is an American writer, journalist and former pro basketball executive.

A New York Times archaeology, science, and film essayist who originated the archaeological column "Lost and Found", Lidz is a former Sports Illustrated senior writer, Smithsonian columnist, and onetime vice president for the Detroit Pistons. His childhood memoir Unstrung Heroes was adapted into a Hollywood film of the same title in 1995.

== Early life ==
Lidz was born in Manhattan, to Sidney, a Jewish electronics engineer who designed the first transistorized portable tape recorder (the Steelman Transitape), and Selma, a homemaker. His father gave him early exposure to authors like Samuel Beckett, Harold Pinter and Eugène Ionesco.

At age nine, still named Stephen before later legally taking Franz as his first name, he moved to the Philadelphia suburbs. Lidz attended high school in Cheltenham and college at Antioch College, where he was a theater major.

== Career ==
Lidz was a novice reporter at the weekly Sanford Star, where he wrote a column and covered police and fire beats. He left Maine to become a crime reporter and write a column called "Insect Jazz" for an alternative newspaper in Baltimore. He later became an editor of Johns Hopkins University Magazine.

In 1980, he joined the staff of Sports Illustrated, even though he had never read the magazine and had covered only one sporting event in his life – a pigeon race in Shapleigh, Maine. Lidz remained on the writing staff for 27 years. In 2007 he jumped to the short-lived business monthly Conde Nast Portfolio, then Slate (magazine) and WSJ. magazine before landing at Smithsonian in 2012. His first feature story in The New York Times, on making the second descent of the Zambezi River, appeared on January 30, 1983.

Among his most controversial features are essays on reappraising the dodo; reconsidering Odysseus; Neanderthals; and Don King's hair; the effects of climate change on glacial archaeology; the Pacific Northwest barred owl cull; Hannibal; the 2002 Paris-to-Dakar Rally; George Steinbrenner and the New York Yankees' line of succession; the hijinks of onetime Los Angeles Clippers owner Donald Sterling; and a S.I. cover story with NBA player Jason Collins in which Collins became the first active male in one of the four major North American team sports to announce he was gay.

== Notable works ==
=== Unstrung Heroes ===
Unstrung Heroes is about Lidz's childhood, with his mother, father and his dad's four older brothers. He had previously written about two of the uncles in Sports Illustrated.

In his review of Unstrung Heroes in The New York Times, Christopher Lehmann-Haupt called the memoir "unusual and affecting ... a melancholy, funny book, a loony tune played with touching disharmony on mournful woodwinds and a noisy klaxon". Jonathan Kirsch of the Los Angeles Times likened the memoir to a "miniature Brothers Karamazov. There's not a false moment in the book, and that is high praise indeed." The Village Voice called Unstrung Heroes: "Astonishing, hilarious, angry, poignant, always pointed."

In 1995, Unstrung Heroes was adapted into a film of the same title. The setting was switched from New York City to Southern California, and the four crazy uncles were reduced to an eccentric odd couple. Asked what he thought of the script, Lidz said: "It's very neatly typed". He was unhappy with the adaptation, but was prevented by his contract from publicly criticizing it. "My initial fear was that Disney would turn my uncles into Grumpy and Dopey", he told New York magazine. "I never imagined my life could be turned into Old Yeller." In a later essay for The New York Times, he said that the cinematic Selma had died not of cancer, but of 'Old Movie Disease'. "Someday somebody may find a cure for cancer, but the terminal sappiness of cancer movies is probably beyond remedy."

=== Ghosty Men ===
Ghosty Men (2003) is the story of the Collyer brothers. Lidz has said that he was inspired by the real-life cautionary tales that his father told him, the most macabre of which was the story of the Collyer brothers, the hermit hoarders of Harlem. The book also recounts the parallel life of Arthur Lidz, the hermit uncle of Unstrung Heroes, who grew up near the Collyer mansion.

In his review for The Washington Post, Adam Bernstein wrote, "The Collyer Brothers made compelling reading then, as they do now in this short, captivatingly detailed book."

=== Fairway to Hell ===
Fairway to Hell is a 2008 memoir centering on Lidz' unusual golfing experiences: encountering nudists, llama caddies and celebrities like the heavy metal band Judas Priest. Bill Littlefield reviewed the book on the National Public Radio show Only A Game, saying "His estimable wit is also evident in Fairway To Hell."

== Collaborations ==
Lidz has written numerous essays for The New York Times with novelist and former Sports Illustrated colleague Steve Rushin. Three of them appear under the title Piscopo Agonistes in the 2000 collection Mirth of a Nation: The Best Contemporary Humor.

Lidz has been a commentator for Morning Edition on NPR, a guest author on Fresh Air on NPR and on WPR a guest commentator on The New York Times news podcast The Daily and a guest film critic on the syndicated Siskel & Ebert, following Gene Siskel's death. The Siskel and Ebert segment did not air. He also appeared on David Letterman's show.

== Personal life ==
Lidz lives in Ojai, California with his wife, Maggie, an author and onetime historian at the Winterthur Museum in Delaware. They have two daughters.
