= The Best American Sports Writing =

American sports magazine

The Best American Sports Writing was a yearly anthology of magazine articles on the subject of sports published in the United States. It started in 1991 as part of The Best American Series published by Houghton Mifflin and ceased publication in 2020. It was preceded by the Best American Sports Stories (1945–1991) and succeeded by The Year’s Best Sports Writing (2021–present), published by Triumph Books.

Articles were chosen using the same procedure as other titles in the Best American Series; the series editor chose about 70–100 article candidates, from which the guest editor picked 25 or so for publication; many, but not all of the remaining runner-up articles were listed in the appendix. The series has been edited since its inception by Glenn Stout.

Traditionally loaded with long-form feature stories and an occasional column, the annual book is considered a must-read by many sports writers, though the reach of its influence is debatable. Authors who have appeared in the series five or more times in its history are: Gary Smith (13 times), Wright Thompson (12), Steve Friedman (10), S.L. Price (nine), Charles P. Pierce (nine), William Nack (seven), Rick Reilly (seven), Roger Angell (seven), Pat Jordan (seven), Rick Telander (seven), Linda Robertson (six), Paul Solotaroff (six), Chris Jones (six), Chris Ballard (six), Mark Kram Jr. (five), Bill Plaschke (five), Peter Richmond (five) and Steve Rushin (five).

It also includes award-winning writers whose genre is not exclusively sports writing, such as Jeanne Marie Laskas whose 2008 piece "G-L-O-R-Y!" offered a rare look at professional cheerleaders. The series includes the Best American Sports Writing of the Century, published in 2000. The guest editor for that book was David Halberstam, who also served as the guest editor for the first edition of the series, in 1991.

== Guest editors ==
Selected from the cream of the sports journalism crop, nearly every guest editor has had at least one story published in a previous or later edition of the book. The only exceptions are John Feinstein, and Dick Schaap (whose work appeared twice in the Best American Sports Writing of the Century anthology).

- 1991: David Halberstam
- 1992: Thomas McGuane
- 1993: Frank Deford
- 1994: Thomas Boswell
- 1995: Dan Jenkins
- 1996: John Feinstein
- 1997: George Plimpton
- 1998: Bill Littlefield
- 1999: Richard Ford
- 2000: Dick Schaap
- 2001: Bud Collins
- 2002: Rick Reilly
- 2003: Buzz Bissinger
- 2004: Richard Ben Cramer
- 2005: Mike Lupica
- 2006: Michael Lewis
- 2007: David Maraniss
- 2008: William Nack
- 2009: Leigh Montville
- 2010: Peter Gammons
- 2011: Jane Leavy
- 2012: Michael Wilbon
- 2013: J.R. Moehringer
- 2014: Christopher McDougall
- 2015: Wright Thompson
- 2016: Rick Telander
- 2017: Howard Bryant
- 2018: Jeff Pearlman
- 2019: Charles P. Pierce
- 2020: Jackie MacMullan
