= Bill Steinecke =

American baseball player (1907–1986)

- Catcher
- Born: February 7, 1907; Cincinnati, Ohio, U.S.
- Died: July 20, 1986 (aged 79); Saint Augustine, Florida, U.S.
- Batted: Right Threw: Right

MLB debut
- September 16, 1931, for the Pittsburgh Pirates

Last MLB appearance
- September 24, 1931, for the Pittsburgh Pirates

MLB statistics
- Games played: 4
- At bats: 4
- Hits: 0
- Stats at Baseball Reference

Teams
- Pittsburgh Pirates (1931)

William Robert Steinecke (February 7, 1907 – July 20, 1986) was an American professional baseball catcher and manager. A native of Cincinnati who attended DePaul University, Steinecke spent almost 40 years in uniform, but only four games in Major League Baseball (with the 1931 Pittsburgh Pirates). He threw and batted right-handed, stood 5 ft 8 in (1.73 m) (173 cm) tall and weighed 175 pounds (79 kg) as an active player.

Steinecke's playing career began in 1925 with the Rock Island Islanders of the Class D Mississippi Valley League. After batting .361 for the Binghamton Triplets of the Class B New York–Pennsylvania League — and being elected the loop's all-star catcher for 1931 — Steinecke received his Pittsburgh trial. In four games and four at bats between September 16 and September 24, 1931, he went hitless. By the opening of the 1932 season, he was back at Binghamton. Steinecke achieved his most sustained success in the New York–Penn League of the 1930s (now the Eastern League), batting over .300 in six different seasons. In his best campaign, 1936 for the Williamsport Grays, Steinecke batted .349 with 110 runs batted in in 132 games played. All told, he appeared in 1,907 minor league games over 21 different seasons, batting .297 with 57 home runs and 855 RBI.

Steinecke's long minor-league managerial career began in 1937 in the Class B Sally League, and from 1946 to 1964 he skippered clubs in the lower minors. He joined the Milwaukee Braves farm system in 1955 and continued with the Braves through the middle of 1964. (As manager of the Class D McCook Braves of the Nebraska State League, he was a figure in former bonus-baby pitcher Pat Jordan's memoir, A False Spring.) He then served as a scout for the Braves and Montreal Expos. Steinecke died at age 79 in Saint Augustine, Florida.
