= Grand Island, Nebraska minor league baseball history =

Grand Island, Nebraska minor league baseball teams
- 1892–1959; (1892, 1910–1915, 1922–1924, 1928–1932, 1937–1938, 1956–1959); Grand Island, Nebraska

Minor league affiliations
- Class: Class B (1892); Class D (1910–1915, 1922–1924, 1928–1932, 1937–1938, 1956–1959)
- League: Nebraska State League (1892 1910–1915, 1922–1923); Tri-State League (1924); Nebraska State League (1928–1932, 1937–1938, 1956–1959)

Major league affiliations
- Team: St. Louis Cardinals (1937–1938); Kansas City Athletics (1956–1959)

Minor league titles
- League titles (3): 1914; 1931; 1957

Team data
- Name: Grand Island Sugar Citys (1892); Grand Island Collegians (1910–1913); Grand Island Islanders (1914); Grand Island Champions (1915, 1922–1923); Grand Island Islanders (1924); Grand Island Champs (1928); Grand Island Islanders (1929–1932); Grand Island Red Birds (1937); Grand Island Cardinals (1938); Grand Island Athletics (1956–1959)
- Ballpark: Municipal Field (1956–1959)

Minor league baseball teams were based in Grand Island, Nebraska in various seasons between 1892 and 1959. Grand Island teams played as members of the Nebraska State League (1892, 1910–1915, 1922–1923), Tri-State League (1924) and Nebraska State League (1928–1932, 1937–1938, 1956–1959), winning three league championships.

Grand Island was a minor league affiliate of the St. Louis Cardinals in 1937 and 1938 and Kansas City Athletics from 1956 to 1959.

== History ==
From 1956 to 1959, the Nebraska State League was composed of players in their first professional season. Based in Grand Island, Nebraska, the team was an affiliate of the Kansas City Athletics. The Grand Island Athletics or "A's" played their home games at Municipal Field. The A's captured the League Championship in 1957.

Grand Island also played as a member of the Nebraska State League from 1937 to 1938, 1928–1932, 1922–1923, 1910–1915 and in 1892. Grand Island played as the Grand Island Cardinals (1938), Grand Island Red Birds (1937), the Grand Island Islanders (1929–1932, 1914), Grand Island Champs (1928), Grand Island Champions (1922-1923, 1915), Grand Island Collegians (1910-1913) and Grand Island Sugar Citys (1892). The Grand Island Islanders played in the Tri-State League for the 1924 season. Overall, Grand Island captured Nebraska State League championships in 1914, 1931 and 1957.

Many of the Grand Island players lived in Grand Island's Yancey Hotel.

The Nebraska State League permanently folded after the 1959 season, along with 1959 league members Grand Island Athletics, Hastings Giants, Holdrege White Sox, Kearney Yankees, McCook Braves and North Platte Indians. Grand Island has not hosted another minor league team.

== The ballpark ==
The Grand Island Athletics teams played minor league home games at Municipal Field. The ballpark still exists today, within Grand Island's Ryder Park. Municipal Field is located at 202 North Custer Avenue, Grand Island, Nebraska.

== Timeline ==
| Year(s) | # Yrs. | Team | Level | League | Affiliate |
|---|---|---|---|---|---|
| 1892 | 1 | Grand Island Sugar Citys | Class B | Nebraska State League | None |
| 1910–1913 | 4 | Grand Island Collegians | Class D | Nebraska State League | None |
| 1914 | 1 | Grand Island Islanders | Class D | Nebraska State League | None |
| 1915, 1922–1923 | 3 | Grand Island Champions | Class D | Nebraska State League | None |
| 1924 | 1 | Grand Island Islanders | Class D | Tri-State League | None |
| 1928 | 1 | Grand Island Champs | Class D | Nebraska State League | None |
| 1929–1932 | 4 | Grand Island Islanders | Class D | Nebraska State League | None |
| 1937 | 1 | Grand Island Red Birds | Class D | Nebraska State League | St. Louis Cardinals |
| 1938 | 1 | Grand Island Cardinals | Class D | Nebraska State League | St. Louis Cardinals |
| 1956–1959 | 4 | Grand Island Athletics | Class D | Nebraska State League | Kansas City Athletics |

== Year-by-year records ==
| Year | Record | Finish | Manager | Playoffs |
|---|---|---|---|---|
| 1956 | 35–28 | 2nd | Art Mazmanian | No playoffs held |
| 1957 | 33–22 | 1st | Art Mazmanian | League champions |
| 1958 | 33–30 | 3rd | Art Mazmanian | No playoffs held |
| 1959 | 32–30 | 3rd | Art Mazmanian | No playoffs held |

== Notable alumni ==
- Jack Aker (1959)
- Jim Cockman (1912)
- Murry Dickson (1937) MLB All-Star
- Eddie Lake (1937)
- Lou Klimchock (1957)
- Art Mazmanian (1956–1958, MGR) 1984 USA Olympic Team coach
- Lenny Metz (1922–1923)
- Len Rice (1937)
- Jose Santiago (1959) MLB All-Star
- Fresco Thompson (1923)
- Chuck Ward (1913–1914)
- Ed Willett (1922, MGR)
