= Giltner, Nebraska =

- Village
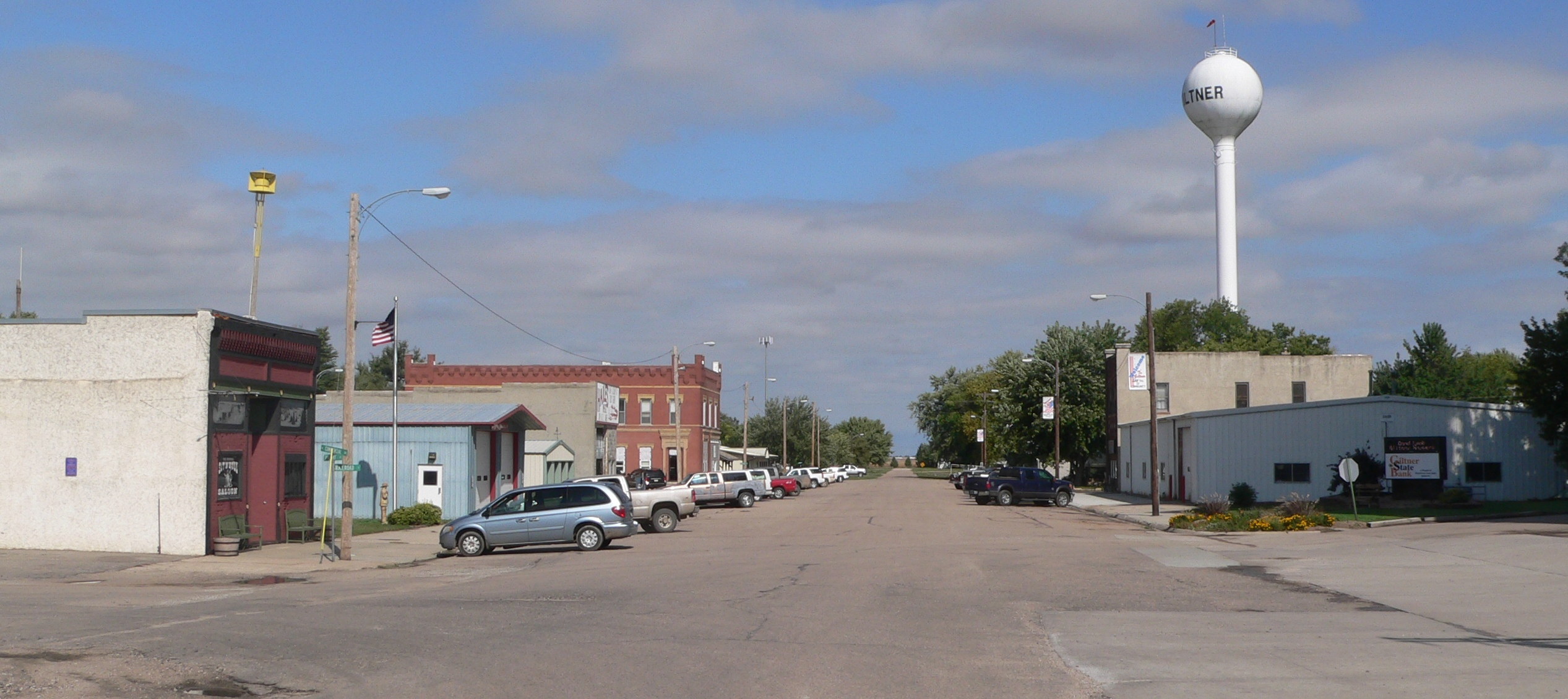
- Downtown Giltner: Commercial Avenue

- Location of Giltner, Nebraska
- Coordinates: 40°46′30″N 98°09′13″W
- Country: United States
- State: Nebraska
- County: Hamilton

Area
  - Total: 0.39 sq mi (1.01 km^{2})
  - Land: 0.39 sq mi (1.00 km^{2})
  - Water: 0.0039 sq mi (0.01 km^{2})
- Elevation: 1,831 ft (558 m)

Population (2020)
  - Total: 406
  - Density: 1,048.2/sq mi (404.71/km^{2})
- Time zone: UTC-6 (Central (CST))
  - Summer (DST): UTC-5 (CDT)
- ZIP code: 68841
- Area code: 402
- FIPS code: 31-18825
- GNIS feature ID: 2398964
- Website: giltnerne.com

Giltner is a village in Hamilton County, Nebraska, United States. As of the 2020 census, Giltner had a population of 406.

== Geography ==
According to the United States Census Bureau, the village has a total area of 0.39 square miles (1.01 km^{2}), all land.

== Naming history ==
In 1886, the Lincoln Land Company purchased land in the Union township. The Lincoln Land Company's business was to purchase land along the railroad and develop towns along the line. In May, a town was platted and named "Huntington", after an employee's home town in Pennsylvania.

In February 1887, the post office asked that the town's name be changed, due to the original name's similarity to Hartington, Nebraska. The town was accordingly given the name "Bromfield". By 1890, there was a local newspaper called the Bromfield Bulletin, as well as a number of stores and services, a lumberyard, two grain elevators, a school, a saloon and a church. At this time, the population of Bromfield was just under 200 people.

The town was renamed again in 1895, again at the request of the post office, and again because of its similarity to that of another town: Bloomfield, Nebraska. The new name was chosen to honor H. M. Giltner, the minister who had established the town's Presbyterian church.

== Baseball ==
Giltner was home to minor league baseball. In 1903, the Giltner team played as charter members of the short–lived Central Nebraska League, an Independent level five-team league. The Central Nebraska League folded after the 1903 season.

== Demographics ==
Historical population
Census	Pop.	Note	%±
1890	195		—
1900	282		44.6%
1910	410		45.4%
1920	387		−5.6%
1930	355		−8.3%
1940	325		−8.5%
1950	284		−12.6%
1960	293		3.2%
1970	408		39.2%
1980	400		−2.0%
1990	367		−8.2%
2000	389		6.0%
2010	352		−9.5%
2020	406		15.3%
U.S. Decennial Census

=== 2010 census ===
As of the census of 2010, there were 352 people, 134 households, and 102 families residing in the village. The population density was 902.6 inhabitants per square mile (348.5/km^{2}). There were 151 housing units at an average density of 387.2 per square mile (149.5/km^{2}). The racial makeup of the village was 98.6% White, 0.3% Pacific Islander, 0.3% from other races, and 0.9% from two or more races. Hispanic or Latino people of any race were 0.3% of the population.

There were 134 households, of which 37.3% had children under the age of 18 living with them, 66.4% were married couples living together, 4.5% had a female householder with no husband present, 5.2% had a male householder with no wife present, and 23.9% were non-families. 18.7% of all households were made up of individuals, and 8.9% had someone living alone who was 65 years of age or older. The average household size was 2.63 and the average family size was 2.97.

The median age in the village was 40 years. 27.6% of residents were under the age of 18; 3.7% were between the ages of 18 and 24; 26.1% were from 25 to 44; 29% were from 45 to 64; and 13.6% were 65 years of age or older. The gender makeup of the village was 51.1% male and 48.9% female.

=== 2000 census ===
As of the census of 2000, there were 389 people, 139 households, and 104 families residing in the village. The population density was 1,283.6 inhabitants per square mile (495.6/km^{2}). There were 153 housing units at an average density of 504.8 per square mile (194.9/km^{2}). The racial makeup of the village was 97.94% White, 0.51% African American, 0.26% Native American, 0.77% from other races, and 0.51% from two or more races. Hispanic or Latino people of any race were 1.03% of the population.

There were 139 households, out of which 36.0% had children under the age of 18 living with them, 61.9% were married couples living together, 7.9% had a female householder with no husband present, and 24.5% were non-families. 22.3% of all households were made up of individuals, and 9.4% had someone living alone who was 65 years of age or older. The average household size was 2.80 and the average family size was 3.29.

In the village, the population was spread out, with 30.8% under the age of 18, 7.5% from 18 to 24, 28.8% from 25 to 44, 21.9% from 45 to 64, and 11.1% who were 65 years of age or older. The median age was 34 years. For every 100 females, there were 95.5 males. For every 100 females age 18 and over, there were 102.3 males.

As of 2000 the median income for a household in the village was $40,417, and the median income for a family was $45,179. Males had a median income of $27,583 versus $22,143 for females. The per capita income for the village was $13,937. About 11.0% of families and 10.6% of the population were below the poverty line, including 16.1% of those under age 18 and 9.1% of those age 65 or over.
