= Unstrung Heroes =

- Unstrung Heroes DVD cover
- Directed by: Diane Keaton
- Screenplay by: Richard LaGravenese
- Based on: Unstrung Heroes by Franz Lidz
- Produced by: Susan Arnold; Bill Badalato; Donna Arkoff Roth
- Starring: Andie MacDowell; John Turturro; Michael Richards; Maury Chaykin
- Cinematography: Phedon Papamichael Jr.
- Edited by: Lisa Zeno Churgin
- Music by: Thomas Newman
- Production company: Hollywood Pictures
- Distributed by: Buena Vista Pictures Distribution
- Release date: September 15, 1995
- Running time: 93 minutes
- Country: United States
- Language: English
- Box office: $7,929,434

Unstrung Heroes is a 1995 American comedy-drama film directed by Diane Keaton and starring Andie MacDowell, John Turturro, Michael Richards, and Maury Chaykin. The screenplay by Richard LaGravenese is based on the memoir of the same name by journalist Franz Lidz.

At the 68th Academy Awards, the film received a nomination for Thomas Newman's score (his third overall), losing out to Alan Menken and Stephen Schwartz for their work in Walt Disney's Pocahontas.

== Plot ==
When young Steven's mother Selma is diagnosed with ovarian cancer and becomes increasingly ill, his eccentric and emotionally distant inventor father Sid — despite deep reservations — allows him to live with his dysfunctional uncles, compulsive hoarder Arthur and delusional paranoid Danny, in their cluttered apartment in the rundown King Edward Hotel. The two nickname the boy Franz and help him cope with his emotions by teaching him to value his own uniqueness. Learning from the pair that art always survives even though hope and science may fail Franz secretly begins to create a memorial to his mother before she dies, filling a box with personal mementos — a tube of lipstick, an empty Chanel bottle, a cigarette lighter, and the like.

== Cast ==
- Andie MacDowell as Selma Lidz
- John Turturro as Sid Lidz
- Michael Richards as Danny Lidz
- Maury Chaykin as Arthur Lidz
- Nathan Watt as Steven/Franz Lidz
- Anne DeSalvo as May
- Celia Weston as Amelia
- Jack McGee as Lindquist
- Candice Azzara as Joanie
- Kendra Krull as Sandy Lidz
- Giuseppe Andrews as Ash (as Joey Andrews)
- Lillian Adams as Aunt Estelle
- Lou Cutell as Uncle Melvin
- Harold M. Schulweis as Rabbi Blaustein (as Rabbi Harold M. Schulweis)
- Zoaunne LeRoy as Mrs. Kantruitz
- Vince Melocchi as Inspector Marshall
- Chris Warfield as Mr. Clements
- Wayne Duvall as Mr. Crispi
- Becky Ann Baker as Mrs. Harris
- Julie Pinson as Nurse Franklin

== Production ==
The film shifted the original story's setting of New York City to Southern California, and the four uncles from the memoir were condensed into two.

Keaton's previous directing credits were the 1987 documentary Heaven and the 1991 television movie Wildflower.

The film debuted at the 1995 Cannes Film Festival in May. Prior to its release, it was shown at the Toronto International Film Festival and the Boston Film Festival, both held in September 1995.

During its widest release in the US, the film played at only 576 theaters. It grossed $7,929,000.

== Release ==
The film performed well at the box office.

== Reception ==
On the review aggregator website Rotten Tomatoes, 76% of 25 critics' reviews are positive, with an average rating of 6.5/10. The website's consensus reads: "Sensitive direction and a terrific cast help Unstrung Heroes get at the heart of human grief -- and depict the relationships that can start the healing process."

In a New York profile that ran before the film's release, Franz Lidz confessed, "My initial fear was that Disney would turn my uncles into Grumpy and Dopey. I never imagined that my life could be turned into Old Yeller." Later, in an essay for the New York Times, he cracked that the cinematic Selma had died not of cancer, but of Old Movie Disease: "The way Disney killed off my mother -- after fixing pancakes, she praises her kids, plants a perversely passionate kiss on her husband's lips and, to soulful strains of You Are My Sunshine, drifts off to die in a comfy armchair -- reminded me of Mad magazine's send-up of Love Story." He added, "Someday somebody may find a cure for cancer, but the terminal sappiness of cancer movies is probably beyond remedy."

Todd McCarthy of Variety wrote: "A coming-of-age piece that is slight to the point of anemia, "Unstrung Heroes" sports a willful eccentricity that almost immediately becomes annoying. Diane Keaton's debut dramatic feature aims for a distinctively offbeat tone that never really gels and the movie's emotional power, stemming from personal growth through family tragedy, falls short of the goal as well."

In her review in The New York Times, Janet Maslin called Unstrung Heroes "a warm, surprising, gently incandescent film . . . [that] becomes a celebration of quirky independence and the sustaining powers of art and memory . . . [it] also succeeds in becoming very moving without being maudlin . . . [the] screenplay runs the risk of being generically uplifting, even bland; instead, it has a sharply distinctive flavor, honest pathos and a hint of delightful household magic. Thomas Newman's sparkling musical score echoes that buoyant tone."

Roger Ebert of the Chicago Sun-Times wrote that the film "has been directed by Diane Keaton with an unusual combination of sentiment and quirky eccentricity. There are moments so touching that the heart almost stops."

In the San Francisco Chronicle, Edward Guthmann called the film "a picture that bears comparison to To Kill a Mockingbird . . . [it] is that rare mainstream film that doesn't shout in our ear to make its points. It draws us in, subtly and gracefully, and casts a lingering charm."

Rita Kempley of The Washington Post described the film as "a sensitive coming-of-age story in the sublime tradition of My Life as a Dog."

In Rolling Stone, Peter Travers opined, "Steven Lidz, a 12-year-old growing up in New York during the '60s with a dying mother and a distracted father, turns to his loony but life-affirming uncles. Sugar shock? Wait. Jump ahead to 1991. Steven, now Franz Lidz and a writer for Sports Illustrated, wins acclaim for a childhood memoir that doesn't choke on whimsy or schmaltz. Wait again. The film version, directed by Diane Keaton from a script by Richard LaGravenese (The Bridges of Madison County), isn't above a little tear-jerking. There's also the matters of reducing Steven's four unstrung uncles to two, Danny (Michael Richards) and Arthur (Maury Chaykin); casting Andie MacDowell as Selma, Steven's Jewish mother; and shooting this Lower East Side story in Pasadena, Calif. Guess what? The movie works like a charm."

Audiences surveyed by CinemaScore gave the film a grade "B+" on scale of A+ to F.

== Accolades ==
Thomas Newman was nominated for the Academy Award for Best Original Musical or Comedy Score as well as the Grammy Award for Best Instrumental Composition Written for a Motion Picture or for Television. Michael Richards was nominated for the American Comedy Award for Funniest Supporting Actor in a Motion Picture.
