= Central Nebraska League =

Minor league baseball league

- Formerly: Southwestern Nebraska Baseball League
- Classification: Independent (1903)
- Sport: Minor League Baseball
- First season: 1903
- Folded: 1903
- No. of teams: 5
- Country: United States of America
- Most titles: 1 Holdrege* (1903); McCook* (1903)
- Related competitions: Nebraska State League

The Central Nebraska League was an Independent level minor league baseball league that played in the 1903 season. The five–team Central Nebraska League consisted of franchises based exclusively in Nebraska. The Central Nebraska League played just one season and permanently folded after the 1903 season.

== History ==
The Central Nebraska League began play as an Independent level minor league in 1903, The five members were the teams based in Giltner, Nebraska, Holdrege, Nebraska, McCook, Nebraska, Minden, Nebraska and Red Cloud, Nebraska.

The league began the season calling itself the Southwestern Nebraska Baseball League. The first published standings of the league had the Holdrege and McCook teams tied for first place with 4–0 records on June 19, 1903. Giltner was next with a 3–3 record, followed by Red Cloud 1–5 and Minden 0–4.

On June 19, the "S.W. Nebraska League" published standings showed Holdrege in first place with an 8–1 record. McCook was in second place at 7–3, followed by Minden 3–4, Giltner 3–6 and Red Cloud 1–7.

In standings published on July 3, 1903, the league is called the "Central Nebraska League" for the first time. On that date, Holdrege was in first place with a 10–2 record, followed by McCook at 7–3. Giltner was in third place with a record of 5–8, followed by Minden at 3–7 and Red Cloud 1–11.

Newspaper records indicate that through July 24, 1903, Holdrege and McCook were tied for first place with 19–7 records. The standings were published shortly before the Minden and Giltner teams both disbanded. When Red Cloud and McCook disbanded shortly after, this left only Holdrege remaining. Holdrege then finished the season as a traveling team. The Central Nebraska League permanently folded after the 1903 season.

== 1903 Central Nebraska League teams ==
Team name	City represented	Ballpark	Year active
Giltner	Giltner, Nebraska	Unknown	1903
Holdrege "Silver Ashes"	Holdrege, Nebraska	Unknown	1903
McCook	McCook, Nebraska	Unknown	1903
Minden	Minden, Nebraska	Minden Grounds	1903
Red Cloud "Indians"	Red Cloud, Nebraska	Unknown	1903

== Central Nebraska League standings ==
=== 1903 ===
The exact team records and standings of the 1903 Central Nebraska League are unknown, as the league folded on July 28, 1903. The last known standings were published on July 24, 1903, shortly before Minden and Giltner disbanded. Red Cloud and McCook disbanded shortly thereafter, disbanding the league and leaving Holdrege to continue play as a semi-pro traveling team.

Team standings	W	L	PCT	GB	Managers
Holdrege Silver Ashes	19	7	.730	-	NA
McCook	19	7	.730	-	NA
Giltner	9	18	.333	9½	NA
Red Cloud	8	16	.333	10	NA
Minden	7	15	.318	12	NA

as of July 24, 1903
