= The 34-Ton Bat =

Book by Steve Rushin

The 34-Ton Bat: The Story of Baseball As Told Through Bobbleheads, Cracker Jacks, Jockstraps, Eye Black, and 375 Other Strange and Unforgettable Objects
- Author: Rushin, Steve
- Language: English
- Publisher: Little, Brown and Company
- Publication date: 2013
- Publication place: United States
- Media type: Print (Hardcover)
- Pages: 343
- ISBN: 978-0-316-20093-6
- Dewey Decimal: 796.357-dc23
- LC Class: GV873.R87 2013

The 34-Ton Bat: The Story of Baseball As Told Through Bobbleheads, Cracker Jacks, Jockstraps, Eye Black, and 375 Other Strange and Unforgettable Objects is a 2013 baseball book written by Steve Rushin. Rushin is an American journalist, novelist, and sportswriter for Sports Illustrated magazine. Rushin was named the 2005 National Sportswriter of the Year by the National Sportscasters and Sportswriters Association, and is a four-time finalist for the National Magazine Award.

== Book summary ==
Chapter 1. The Baseball Grenade. Rushin discusses the link between the military and baseball and describes how the military endeavored to design a hand grenade shaped like a baseball which they believed would give American soldiers a natural advantage over the enemy because of the soldier's prowess in throwing balls. In this chapter he also discusses various stunts performed in the 20th century such as catching baseball dropped from planes.

Chapter 2. Stairway to Heaven. Focused on baseball bats, Chapter 2 follows the history of bats and bat manufacturers from the game's earliest days to the development of the aluminum bat. The relationship between players and their bats is highlighted and the book includes several photos of players kissing their bats.

Chapter 3. The Lost City of Francisco Grande. Developed at a cost of $4.5 million by San Francisco Giants owner Horace Stoneham, Francisco Grande was built adjacent to Casa Grande, Arizona as the spring training home for the Giants. The facility, opened in 1961, boasted a private airstrip, an 18-hole golf course, and five baseball fields as well as player rooms, training and administrative offices for the team. Rushin notes that many of Francisco Grande's buildings were decorated with baseball memorabilia such as bats, balls, and gloves and he then continues the chapter with a discussion of the development of baseball gloves. The chapter concludes with an overview of how the catcher's position changed over time and how the development and use of the hinged catcher's glove revolutionized the sport by allowing catchers such as Johnny Bench to catch one-handed.

Chapter 4. The Men in the Gray Flannel Suits. The history of uniforms, stirrup socks and caps are the subject of this chapter. Using numbers on uniforms to identify players as well as stenciling their names on the backs of jerseys is also discussed.

Chapter 5. The Beanproof Cap of Foulproof Taylor. Chapter 5 begins by describing challenges fielders face when looking for a fly ball in the sun. To see better, as well as to protect their eyes, players began wearing sun glasses in the early 1900s. Protecting a players eyes, however was of secondary importance to protecting a player's head which could only be accomplished by a hardened shell worn under, over or in the place of a cap. One of the early inventors of protective headgear was James Philip Leo Taylor, a British immigrant and inventor, who after suffering a groin injury, developed one of the first protective cups designed to protect male genitalia. Taylor's version of a protective cap never became popular nor did he ever achieve fame or wealth as a result of his other safety inventions, but eventually, and mainly as the result of devastating accidents, safety gear was worn by all baseball players.

Chapter 6. The Decrepit Urinals of Ebbets Field. The consumption of beer by patrons drove the need for large and smartly designed ball park bathroom facilities that could quickly and safely drain the urine of thousands of fans. Some designs were well engineered, others such as those found at Ebbets Field, were not.

Chapter 7. "The Redhots Warmed with Mustard Saved Many a Life." Hot dogs, peanuts, popcorn and other ball park foods are discussed in chapter 7 as well as the rise of concessionaires who not only sold food and drink to fans, but over the years greatly enriched owners by selling souvenirs and clothing.

Chapter 8. Row C, section 42, Seats 3 and 4 at the Polo Grounds. Bullets and baseball are the theme of chapter 8. A stray bullet fired from Coogan's Bluff as an Independence day prank in New York City accidentally killed a fan at the city's Polo Grounds on July 4, 1950. Exactly 35 years later, another bullet struck a fan, this time in Yankee Stadium. Rushin pieces the story together by recounting how a New York city police officer was shot in 1877 and given an award for valor that featured the letters "N" and "Y" superimposed on each other. The New York City police chief at the time was Bill Devery who later became the New York Yankees owner and adopted the design for the team. Featured on Yankees caps, the design has become one of the most recognized designs in the world.

Chapter 9. Recessional. Rushin ends the book was a review of music in ballparks and the journey taken from organists to contemporary rock and relates the journey to the one he has taken growing up in the United States.

== Reviews ==
As of November, 2013 the book had not been widely reviewed in national media outlets, however the notable reviewers who had reviewed the book praised it for Rushin's approach to the subject matter as well as for his entertaining prose.

"The 34-Ton Bat"-named for the enormous, 120-foot-tall bat that leans against the Louisville Slugger Museum in Louisville, Ky.-is full of bits of information that will give even the most knowledgeable fan a new understanding of the game and of those who have played it. 'Material culture' is the academic term for the study of physical objects as a means of getting at larger truths and understanding historical turning points. It is exactly what anthropologists and archaeologists have long done, as they coax conclusions from shards of pottery and projectile points. In recent years, popular authors have taken a page from this playbook and given us, among other titles, Neil MacGregor's "A History of the World in 100 Objects," Harold Holzer's "The Civil War in 50 Objects" and Tom Standage's "A History of the World in 6 Glasses." Now veteran Sports Illustrated writer and columnist Steve Rushin has applied this notion to baseball by rummaging through the attic of the national pastime and telling its story through objects as central as the bat and ball and even humbler elements-including the primitive steel cups fashioned to protect the "family jewels" and ballpark urinals, a necessity made all the more urgent because of the oceans of beer consumed at ballparks."

"It's become a cliché to say everything has a story, but in baseball, you could make the argument that everything really does. Even the baseball itself is a story -- one of geography and symbolism -- an almost holy relic of American culture. Sportswriter Steve Rushin tells the story of these objects in his latest book, The 34-Ton Bat."

"In an unhurried manner not unlike a leisurely afternoon game, author Steve Rushin wanders through the fields of baseball, passing through locker rooms and outfields, touching upon every object in between. In doing that, Rushin delights trivia buffs with little-known knowledge and a wicked sense of humor. Such uncommon tidbits will also appeal to baseball fans who are already nuts for stats, history, and the minutiae of America's Pastime. And if that's you, then this unique and fun book is one you'll want to catch soon. The glorious 2013 baseball season may be behind us, but "The 34-Ton Bat" can keep you company until the defending champs step up to the plate in spring training."
