= Hotel Yancey (Grand Island, Nebraska) =

Historic hotel in Grand Island, Nebraska, U.S.

- U.S. National Register of Historic Places
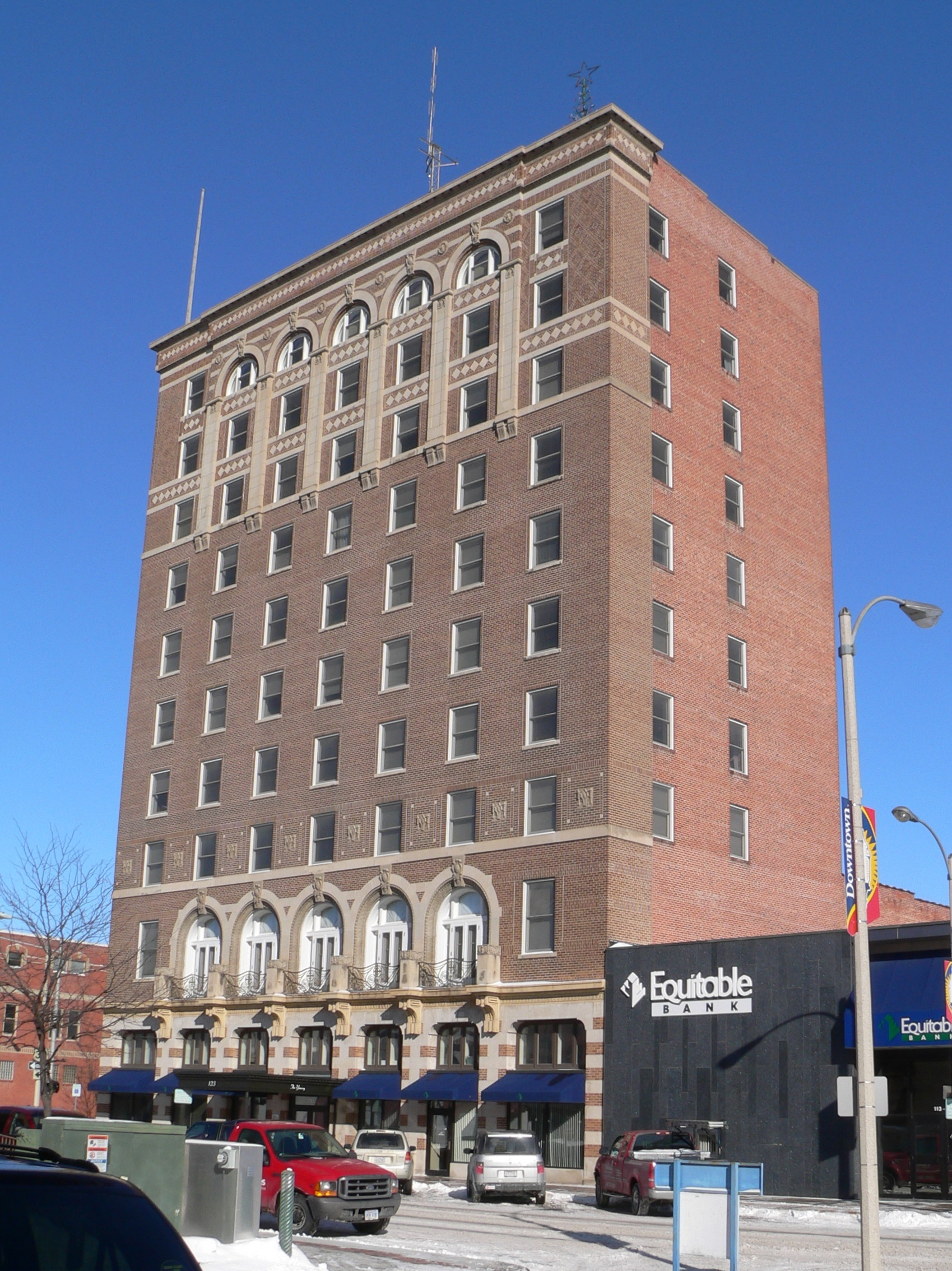
- Hotel Yancey seen from the southwest in 2010
- Location: 123 N. Locust St., Grand Island, Nebraska, U.S.
- Coordinates: 40°55′28″N 98°20′23″W
- Area: less than one acre
- Built: 1917–1923
- Architect: Francis W. Fitzpatrick, of Bankers Realty Investment Company
- Architectural style: Late 19th And Early 20th Century American Movements, Renaissance
- Restored: 1985
- NRHP reference No.: 84000504
- Added to NRHP: December 13, 1984

The Hotel Yancey, also known as The Yancey Motor Inn, is an 11-story hotel building in Grand Island, Nebraska, United States. Built from 1917 to 1923, it was the tallest building in Grand Island until 2007. It was named after its investor William Yancey. It was listed on the National Register of Historic Places in 1984. In addition to providing lodging to guests with its 150 rooms, the original first-class hotel featured a billiard room, telegraph office, pharmacy, cigar stand, coffee shop and sample rooms. It also housed KGEO, which was Grand Island's first radio station and in 1976 it housed the Piccadilly Dinner Theatre.

== History ==
Hotel Yancey was originally announced in 1917 as a ten-story hotel building by the North American Hotel Company. It would be the tallest building in Grand Island. Construction began the following year. However, due to material shortages around World War I, construction was delayed by several years. In 1922, William Yancey, proprietor of the Magnus Hotel in Cedar Rapids, Iowa, purchased the lease on the hotel, and the hotel was later named for him. Construction resumed the following year, and Hotel Yancey officially opened as the Yancey Motor Inn in 1923.

The hotel was purchased by Lincoln Benefit Life Co. on auction on December 11, 1975. By 1982, Lincoln Benefit Life Co. failed to pay utilities, and the hotel closed in December of that same year. Two years later, in June 1984, it was announced that a group of several companies based in Lincoln purchased the hotel. Renovation of the hotel to turn it into condominiums began the following month, and were completed the next year. Hotel Yancey was officially registered on the National Register of Historic Places on December 13, 1984.

== Architecture ==
Hotel Yancey was designed by Francis W. Fitzpatrick and reflects the Renaissance Revival architecture. The hotel was built with concrete post and beam construction, brick veneer exterior walls with limestone and terracotta trim. The hotel is eleven stories tall and was the tallest building in Grand Island until being surpassed by St. Francis Medical Center's hospital tower in 2007.

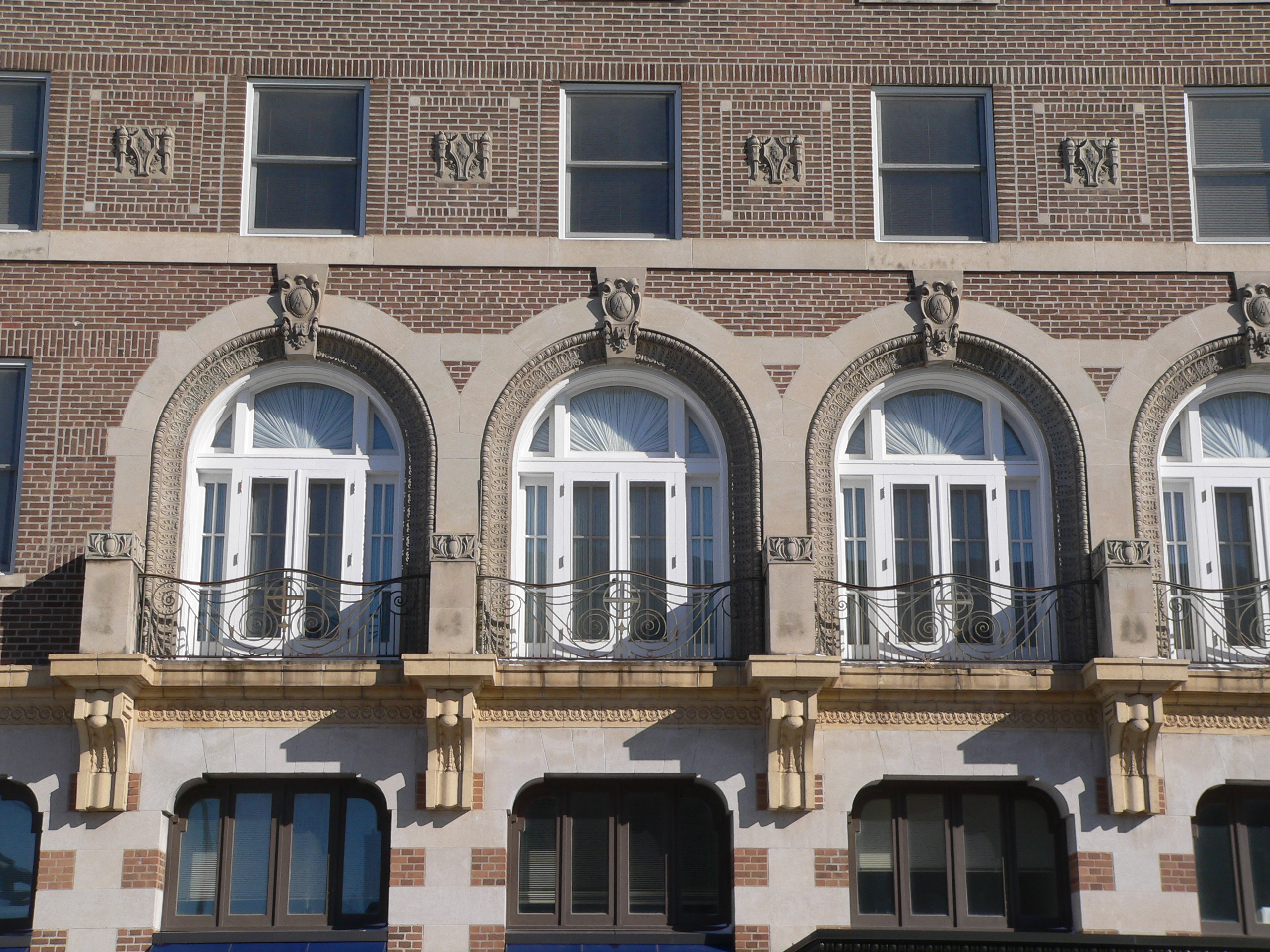
Second-floor balconies on front (west) side of Hotel Yancey at 123 N. Locust St., Grand Island, Nebraska; seen from the southwest on January 8, 2010.
