= Only a Game =

Weekly US public radio sports program

Only a Game was a weekly sports program distributed by National Public Radio and hosted formerly by Bill Littlefield. It was hosted and produced by Karen Given. The show was produced at WBUR in Boston and aired on 264 affiliate stations around the country every Saturday. The program was one hour long.

Only a Game featured coverage of mainstream sports including the NFL, Major League Baseball, the NBA, the NHL, NASCAR, and men's and women's collegiate sports. Littlefield discussed mainstream sports with the program's regular analysts including Tim Kurkjian (baseball) of ESPN; Kevin Hench (NBA) of Fox Sports; Pat Forde (men's college basketball) of ESPN; Dan Wetzel (college football) of Yahoo! Sports; Helene Elliott (NHL) of the Los Angeles Times; and others.

The program was also known for its coverage of offbeat sports and competitive events. Subjects covered on the program include a race up the stairs at the Empire State Building, an adaptive rowing competition for disabled athletes, lobster boat racing in Maine, and an event formerly known as the Rat Olympics.

Every week Given (or a guest host), and before her original host Bill Littlefield, was joined by sportswriter Charlie Pierce and the two discussed the week's top stories and oddball sports news items.

On June 7, 2018, WBUR announced that Bill Littlefield was "hanging up his cleats." He hosted his final episode as regular host, after 25 years of hosting Only a Game, on July 28, 2018. On June 17, 2020, WBUR announced that the show would end in the fall of 2020.

Guests on Only a Game included John Updike, former U.S. Poet Laureate Robert Pinsky, commentator Bud Collins; current and former athletes Muhammad Ali, Kristine Lilly, former U.S. Senator Bill Bradley, Bill Russell, Oscar Robertson, Lenny Wilkens, and Kareem Abdul-Jabbar; and coaches Pat Summitt and Geno Auriemma.
