= Holdrege White Sox =

- 1956–1959; (1903, 1956–1959); Holdrege, Nebraska

Minor league affiliations
- Class: Independent (1903); Class D (1956–1959)
- League: Central Nebraska League (1903); Nebraska State League (1956–1959)

Major league affiliations
- Team: Chicago White Sox (1956–1959)

Minor league titles
- League titles (1): 1903

Team data
- Name: Holdrege Silver Aces (1903); Holdrege White Sox (1956–1959)
- Ballpark: Holdrege Fairgrounds Park (1956–1959)

The Holdrege White Sox were a minor league baseball team based in Holdrege, Nebraska. The White Sox played as members of the short–season Class D level Nebraska State League from 1956 to 1959 as an affiliate of the Chicago White Sox. Holdrege first fielded a team in the 1903 Central Nebraska League, winning the league title. The White Sox hosted home minor league games at Holdrege Fairgrounds Park.

== History ==
=== 1903: Central Nebraska League ===
Holdrege, Nebraska first fielded a minor league team in 1903, when the Holdrege team became members of the 1903 Central Nebraska League, an Independent level five–team league that folded after one season.

The last known standings were published on July 24, 1903, shortly before the Minden and Giltner teams disbanded. The Red Cloud Indians and McCook would disband shortly thereafter, leaving only Holdrege remaining. Holdrege then played the remainder of the 1903 season as a traveling team. The last known standings had the Holdrege Silver Aces in first place with a 19–7 record, tied with McCook, who had an identical record.

=== 1956–1959: Holdrege White Sox ===
Decades later, the Holdrege "White Sox" resumed minor league play in Holdrege. The White Sox played four seasons as members of the Class D level Nebraska State League, from 1956 to 1959, as an affiliate of the Chicago White Sox.

On opening day in 1956, fans came to the Hotel Dale in Holdrege to see Carl Hubbell, who was a participant in opening day festivities at Fairgrounds Park.

Holdrege had a tradition of Saturday night being "shopping night" in the business district. As a result, Holdrege played Saturday games during the afternoon, as the city's electrical system could not support lights in both the business district and the ballpark being on at the same time.

Holdrege finished the 1956 season with a 33–30 record to place sixth and last in the Nebraska State League standings. The White Sox finished in third place in 1957 with a record of 33–23.

In 1958, Holdrege finished in last place with a record of 29–34 to place sixth. In their final season of play, Holdrege placed second with a 39–23 record. There were no Nebraska State League playoffs in the seasons that Holdrege played.

The Nebraska State League permanently folded after the 1959 season. Holdrege, along with the 1959 league members Hastings Giants, Grand Island Athletics, Kearney Yankees, McCook Braves and North Platte Indians also permanently folded their franchises.

== The ballpark ==
The Holdrege White Sox hosted minor league home games at Holdrege Fairgrounds Park. The ballpark was also known as "White Sox Park" during minor league play there. On July 24, 1956, the wooden grandstands burned down. The bleachers were quickly rebuilt, and some damaged light poles were also replaced at the ballpark. The park was a favorite of hitters, averaging about three home runs per game. The field is still in use today at the Phelps County Fairgrounds.

== Timeline ==
Year(s)	# Yrs.	Team	Level	League	Affiliate	Ballpark
1903	1	Holdrege "Silver Aces"	Independent	Central Nebraska League	None	Unknown
1956–1959	4	Holdrege White Sox	Class D	Nebraska State League	Chicago White Sox	Holdridge Fairgrounds Park

== Year-by-year records ==
Year	Record	Finish	Manager	Playoffs/Notes
1903	19–7	1st	NA	Tied with McCook; Standings on July 24
1956	33–30	6th	Skeeter Scalzi	No playoffs held
1957	33–23	3rd	Frank Parenti	No playoffs held
1958	29–34	6th	George Noga	No playoffs held
1959	39–23	2nd	Frank Parenti	No playoffs held

== Notable alumni ==
- Alan Brice (1956)
- Cam Carreon (1956)
- Jim Hicks (1959)
- Jerry McNertney (1958)
- JC Martin (1956)
- George Noga (1958, MGR)
- Gary Peters (1956) 2 x MLB All-Star; 1963 AL Rookie of the Year
- Skeeter Scalzi (1956, MGR)
- Fred Talbot (1959)
- Al Weis (1959)

== See also ==
Holdrege White Sox players
