= Pat Jordan (author) =

American sports writer (born 1941)

- Born: April 22, 1941 (age 85); Bridgeport, Connecticut, U.S.
- Occupations: Author and Sportswriter
- Writing career
- Notable works: A False Spring; Best American Sports Writing (7x times)
- Website: www.patjordanstories.com

Pat Jordan (born April 22, 1941) is an American sports writer. His work has been included in the Best American Sports Writing anthology series seven times. He is also the author of A False Spring, a bittersweet memoir about his minor league baseball career, which is ranked #37 on Sports Illustrated's Top 100 Sports Books of All Time and which Time called “one of the best and truest books about baseball, and about coming to maturity in America...”

== Minor league baseball player ==
Pat Jordan grew up in Fairfield, Connecticut, where he excelled as a baseball pitcher from a young age, tossing four consecutive no-hitters as a Fairfield little leaguer. He later became a highly pursued prospect after going 17–4 over three seasons for the Fairfield Prep Jesuits. On July 9, 1959, after some 15 MLB organizations showed an interest, Jordan signed a $36,000 bonus with the Milwaukee Braves, reportedly the largest ever given by the Braves to a new player. He reported to the McCook Braves of the Nebraska State League, where he played alongside future Hall of Famers Phil Niekro and Joe Torre. Despite being one of the hardest-throwing pitchers in the minors, Jordan struggled for three seasons, never progressing past Class C ball and recording a 12-22 win-loss record and a 4.98 ERA in 273 innings. (Jordan's biggest problem was accuracy; despite striking out 8.2 batters per nine innings, he walked 8.9 per nine.) Luckily, Jordan had another ability to fall back on: he could write. His memoir, A False Spring, became a best-seller and Jordan retired as a ballplayer and returned home to Connecticut to pursue his new career.

Thirty-six years after throwing his last pitch for the Palatka Redlegs of the Florida State League in 1961, Jordan returned to the mound to start a game with the Waterbury Spirit of independent Northeast League in 1997. The 56-year-old acquitted himself well, allowing no hits or runs and one walk in his single inning on the mound, striking out cleanup hitter Eddie Perozo to end the frame. (Jordan was believed to be the oldest man to pitch in a pro baseball game since Hub Kittle, who threw one inning for St. Louis Cardinals Class A team in Springfield, Illinois, in 1980 at the age of 63.)

== Writer ==
Jordan is the author of eleven books and a regular contributor to many periodicals. Jordan's work has been included in Best American Sports Writing eight times, the Best American Mystery Stories, Best American Crime Writing, Best American Essays, and the Norton Anthology of World Literature.

=== Best American Sports Writing ===
The following writings of Pat Jordan have appeared in the Best American Sports Writing anthology series:

- 1993: The Wit and Wisdom of the White Rat from Los Angeles Times Magazine
- 1995: Behind the Icy Glare from The Sporting News
- 1996: Belittled Big Men from The New York Times Magazine
- 2005: The Lion in Late, Late Autumn from The New York Times Magazine
- 2006: Card Stud from The New York Times Magazine
- 2006: The Magician from The Atlantic Monthly
- 2010: Chasing Jose from Deadspin.com
- 2017: Barry Switzer Laughs Last

=== Best American Mystery Stories ===
The following writings of Pat Jordan have appeared in the Best American Mystery Stories anthology series:

- 1997: The Mark from Playboy, July 1996
- 1998: Beyond Dog from Playboy, August 1997

=== Best American Crime Writing ===
The following writings of Pat Jordan have appeared in the Best American Crime Writing anthology series:

- 2002: The Outcast: Conversations with O.J. Simpson from The New Yorker
- 2004: CSC: Crime Scene Cleanup from Playboy, July 2003

=== Bibliography ===
1. Black Coach (1971, ISBN 978-0-396-06430-5)
2. The Suitors of Spring (1974, ISBN 978-0-396-06711-5)
3. A False Spring (2005, Revised Edition, ISBN 978-0-8032-7626-0)
4. Broken Patterns (1977, ISBN 978-0-396-07387-1)
5. Chase the Game (1979, ISBN 978-0-396-07632-2)
6. After the Sundown (1979, ISBN 978-0-396-07773-2)
7. The Cheat (1985, ISBN 978-0-345-32524-2)
8. a.k.a. Sheila Doyle (2002, ISBN 978-0-7867-1026-3)
9. a.k.a. Sheila Weinstein (2003, ISBN 978-0-7867-1191-8)
10. A Nice Tuesday (2005, ISBN 978-0-8032-7625-3)
11. The Best Sports Writing of Pat Jordan (2008, ISBN 978-0-89255-339-6)
12. My Father's Con: A Memoir (2022, ISBN 978-1-95015-486-9)

== Education ==
Jordan graduated from the Fairfield College Preparatory School in 1959 and received his bachelor's degree in English from Fairfield University in 1965.

== Personal ==
Jordan is married to the mother of actress Meg Ryan. They reside in Abbeville, South Carolina.
