= Steve Rushin =

American sportswriter

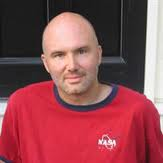
- Steve Rushin, author
- Born: September 22, 1966 (age 60); Elmhurst, Illinois, U.S.
- Education: Marquette University
- Occupations: Journalist, novelist
- Spouse: Rebecca Lobo (m. 2003)
- Children: Siobhan, Maeve, Thomas and Rose
- Writing career
- Notable works: Road Swing (1998) The Caddie Was A Reindeer (2004); The Pint Man (2010); The 34-Ton Bat (2013) Sting Ray Afternoons: a Memoir (2017)
- Website: www.steverushin.com

Steve Rushin (born September 22, 1966) is an American journalist, sportswriter and novelist. He was named the 2005 National Sportswriter of the Year by the National Sportscasters and Sportswriters Association, and is a four-time finalist for the National Magazine Award.

== Early life ==
Rushin grew up in Bloomington, Minnesota, the third in a family of five kids. In 1954 Steve's father, Don, was a blocking back for Johnny Majors at the University of Tennessee. Steve's older brother, Jim, was a forward on the Providence hockey team that reached the Frozen Four in 1983.

In Bloomington, Rushin watched baseball and football games at Metropolitan Stadium, where he sold hot dogs and soda to Twins and Vikings fans.

He is a graduate of John F. Kennedy Senior High School in Bloomington, and Marquette University in Milwaukee.

== Career ==
After reading a story by Sports Illustrated writer Alexander Wolff on the annual Gus Macker three-on-three tournament in Michigan, Rushin struck up a correspondence with Wolff. He ended up writing an anthology of sports nicknames. From A-Train to Yogi, with Wolff and Chuck Wielgus. He joined the staff of S.I. in 1988, two weeks after graduating from Marquette. Within three years, at age 25, he became the youngest Senior Writer on the SI staff. In 1991, he was shuffled back to the Twin Cities to cover hometown reaction to the North Stars' first appearance in the Stanley Cup Final in ten years.

Three years later, Rushin spent four months writing an epic feature for S.I.'s 40th Anniversary issue. The story of his journey was divided into five parts, each exploring an essential aspect of sports in America. One section was a lament for recently razed Metropolitan Stadium whose site became the Mall of America and housed more than 800 stores, making it the largest shopping center in the United States. Rushin's essay – How We Got Here – spanned 24 pages and remains the longest-ever article published in a single issue of S.I. At the magazine, he filed stories from Java, Greenland, the India-Pakistan border and other far- and near-flung locales. Rushin covered events like the World Series, the World Cup and Wimbledon. He ate his way around America's ballparks and once rode a dozen rollercoasters in a day. His weekly column, Air & Space, ran from 1998 to 2007, and was often about sports. He left S.I. in February, 2007, returning in a contributing role in July 2010. He resumed his column - renamed "Rushin Lit" - on an occasional basis in October 2011.

During his time away from S.I., Rushin became a contributor to Golf Digest and Time magazine, for which he wrote back-page essays.

Rushin is the author of the billiards guide Pool Cool (1990), the travelogue Road Swing: One Fan's Journey Into the Soul of America's Sports (1998), the collection The Caddie Was a Reindeer (2004), the novel The Pint Man (2010). and the baseball historical The 34-Ton Bat: The Story of Baseball as Told Through Bobbleheads, Cracker Jacks, Jockstraps, Eye Black, and 375 Other Strange and Unforgettable Objects (2013).

Rushin has written numerous essays for The New York Times with memoirist and former Sports Illustrated colleague Franz Lidz. Three of them appear under the title Piscopo Agonistes in the 2000 collection Mirth of a Nation: The Best Contemporary Humor.

== Personal ==
Rushin is married to college basketball analyst and former basketball player Rebecca Lobo. Rushin and Lobo live with their four children in Connecticut.

In May, 2007, Rushin was the Commencement Day speaker at Marquette, where he was awarded a Doctor of Humane Letters.

His grandfather was baseball player Jimmy Boyle.

== Ball & Chain Podcast ==
Rushin and Lobo host a weekly podcast called the Ball & Chain Podcast. They discuss current events, sports, and family life. They published the first episode on October 23, 2017.
