= Giltner (baseball) =

- 1903; Giltner, Nebraska

Minor league affiliations
- Class: Independent (1903)
- League: Central Nebraska League (1903)

Major league affiliations
- Team: None

Minor league titles
- League titles (0): None

Team data
- Name: Giltner (1903)
- Ballpark: Unknown (1903)

The Giltner team was a minor league baseball team based in Giltner, Nebraska. In 1903, the Giltner team played as members of the Independent level Central Nebraska League, with no known formal nickname, common in the era.

== History ==
In 1903, Giltner, Nebraska first fielded a minor league team, when the Giltner team played as charter members of the short–lived Central Nebraska League, an Independent level league.

The five charter members of the 1903 Central Nebraska League included Giltner, who were joined by the Holdrege Silver Ashes, McCook, Minden and Red Cloud The Giltner team was without a known moniker, as was common in the era.

On July 1, 1903, according to local newspaper reports, Giltner defeated Minden by a score 6–0. On July 2, 1903, it was reported Giltner again defeated Minden by a score of 7–3.

Minden reportedly defeated Giltner by a score of 9–6 on Friday July 17, 1903.

The exact team records and standings of the 1903 Central Nebraska League are unknown. The last known standings were published on July 24, 1903, shortly before the Giltner and Minden teams both disbanded. The July 24 standings showed Giltner with a record of 9–18 and in third place, 9.5 games behind first place Holdrege. The Red Cloud and McCook teams disbanded shortly thereafter, leaving only Holdrege, who finished the season as a traveling team.

The Central Nebraska League permanently folded after the 1903 season. Giltner, Nebraska has not hosted another minor league team.

== The ballpark ==
The name of the 1903 Giltner home ballpark is not directly referenced.

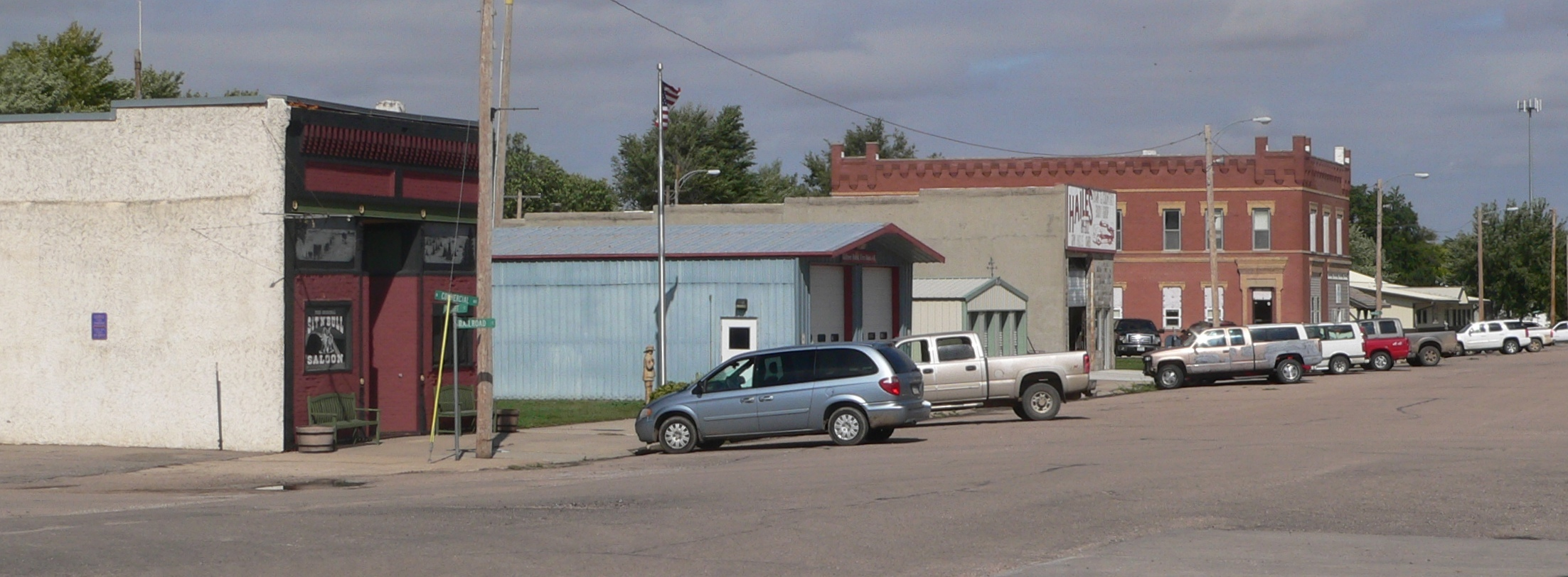
(2013) Giltner, Nebraska. Commercial.

== Yea–-by–year record ==
| Year | Record | Finish | Manager | Playoffs/Notes |
|---|---|---|---|---|
| 1903 | 9–18 | 3rd | NA | Record through July 24 |

== Notable alumni ==
No alumni of the 1903 Giltner team advanced to the major leagues.
