= McCook Braves =

- 1956–1959; McCook, Nebraska

Minor league affiliations
- Class: Class D (1956–1959)
- League: Nebraska State League ( 1956–1959)

Major league affiliations
- Team: Milwaukee Braves (1956–1959)

Minor league titles
- League titles (1): 1959

Team data
- Name: McCook Braves (1956–1959)
- Ballpark: Cibola Field/Red Willow County Fairgrounds (1956–1959)

The McCook Braves were a minor league baseball team based in McCook, Nebraska. From 1956 to 1959, the McCook Braves played as members of the short-season Class D level Nebraska State League as an affiliate of the Milwaukee Braves for their duration. The Braves won the 1959 league championship and were preceded in minor league play by the McCook Generals of the previous edition of the Nebraska State League from 1928 to 1932. The Braves hosted home games at the Ciabola Field, which was within the Red Willow County Fairgrounds.

Baseball Hall of Fame member Phil Niekro pitched for the 1959 McCook Braves.

The 1959 McCook Braves are featured in the book A False Spring, written by McCook Braves player Pat Jordan.

== History ==
McCook first fielded a minor league team in 1903. The McCook team was a member of the 1903 Central Nebraska League, an Independent level five–team league that folded after one season. The last known standings were published on July 24, 1903, shortly before the Minden and Giltner teams disbanded. The Red Cloud Indians and McCook would disband shortly thereafter. The last known standings had the Holdrege Silver Aces and McCook tied for in first place with identical 19–7 records.

Based in McCook, Nebraska, the McCook Braves were members of the Nebraska State League from 1956 to 1959, having been preceded in an earlier Nebraska State League by the McCook Generals, who played from 1928 to 1932, winning Nebraska State League Championships in 1928, 1929 and 1930. The eight–team Nebraska State League reformed as a Class D level league in 1956 after a 15 season hiatus.

In 1956, it was announced that major league baseball had plans to sponsor a new Class D League in Nebraska with affiliate teams. After the announcement, local McCook Baseball Boosters met with the major league owners. Requirements for a franchise in the Nebraska State League included: cities having a lighted ballpark; selling $5,000 in season tickets and providing another $2,500 for incidental expenses, and the ability to provide transportation to away games. Eleven Nebraska cities agreed to these provisions. The eleven names were put into a hat to draw for one of eight franchises. McCook was one of the cities selected for the new league, along with Superior, Grand Island, Hastings, Lexington, Holdrege, North Platte and Kearney. For the required $5,000 in season tickets, McCook hoped to sell 500 at $10 each, McCook instead exceeded that goal in selling 700.

The 1956 McCook Braves began play in the Nebraska State League as an affiliate of the Milwaukee Braves. McCook finished 1956 season with a record of 35–28, placing fourth in the Nebraska State League, 6.0 games behind the first place Lexington Red Sox. The team scored 454 runs, while allowing 427 runs. Bill Steinecke served as manager and would manage the team for all four seasons. Playing at Cibola Field, McCook had home attendance of 32,224, an average of 1,023 per game. McCook pitcher Richard Allen led the league with 11 wins.

The McCook Braves finished sixth in the 1957 Nebraska State League. McCook ended the regular season with a record of 27–29, playing the season under returning manager Bill Steinecke and finishing 6.5 games behind the champion Grand Island Athletics. Home attendance at Cibola Field was 25,844 an average of 923.

In their third season, the 1958 McCook Braves placed second in the Nebraska State League standings. McCook ended the season just 1.0 game behind the champion North Platte Indians in the final standings with a record of 40–23, as Bill Steinecke continued as manager. Cerefino Foy of the Braves led league pitchers with 10 wins.

In their final season, The McCook Braves won the 1959 Nebraska State League Championship. The Braves ended the 1959 season with a record of 43–19 losses, placing first in the Nebraska State League, finishing 4.0 games ahead of the second place Holdrege White Sox in the six–team league. Bill Steinecke was manager for the fourth consecutive season. McCook led the league in home attendance with 19,788. Frank Saia scored 68 runs to lead the league.

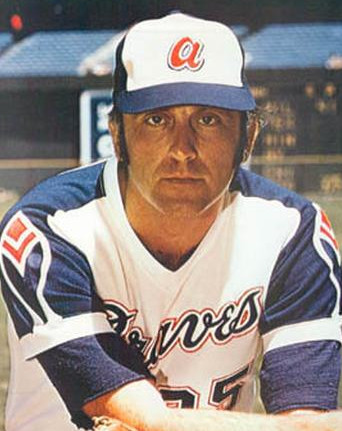
Phil Niekro, 1974

Baseball Hall of Fame member Phil Niekro pitched for the 1959 McCook Braves, finishing with a 7–1 record and a 3.12 ERA in 23 games.

The Nebraska State League folded permanently after the completion of the 1959 season. McCook and the other 1959 league franchises, the Hastings Giants, Holdrege White Sox, Grand Island Athletics, Kearney Yankees and North Platte Indians, all permanently folded as well. For the duration of the league, McCook was second only to Grand Island in attendance. McCook, Nebraska has not hosted another minor league franchise.

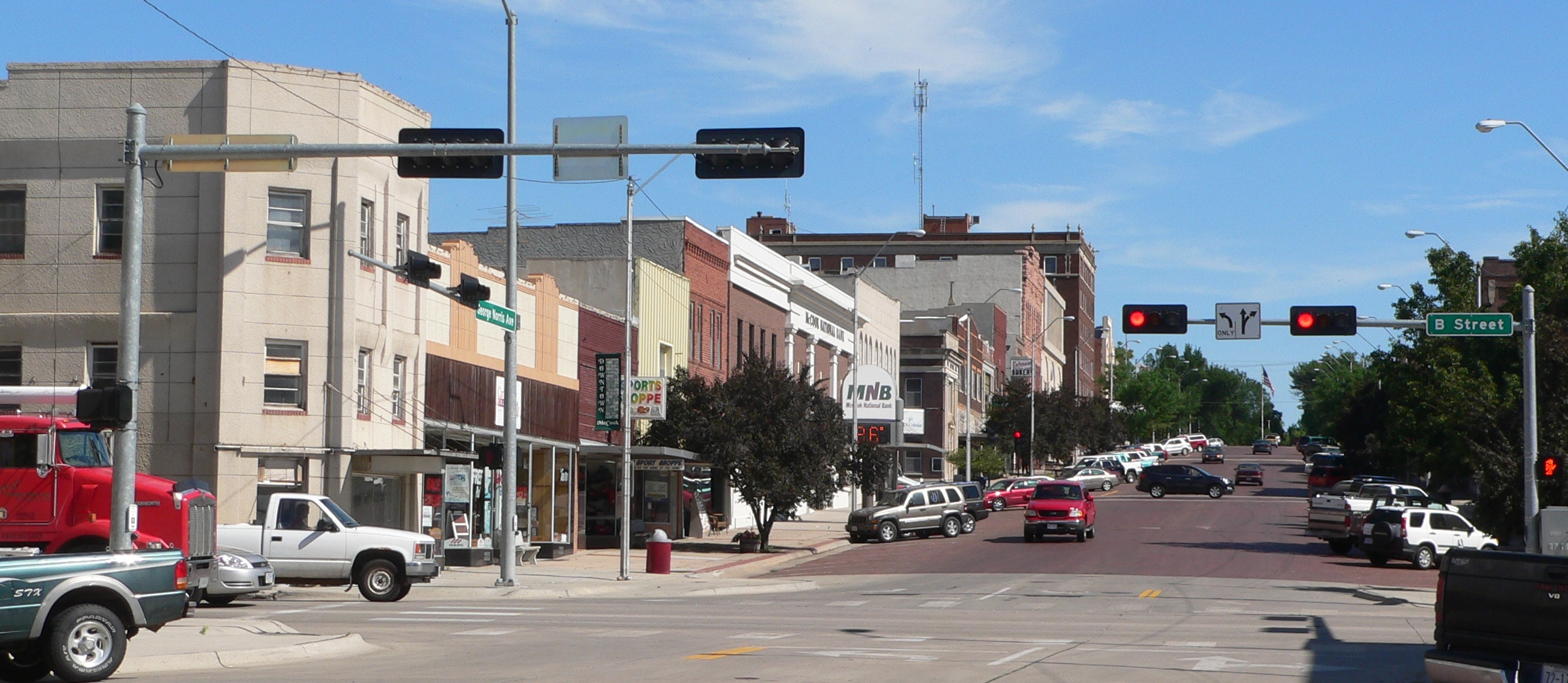
(2010) McCook, Nebraska

== The ballpark ==
The McCook Generals were noted to have played at the Red Willow County Fairgrounds. After their demise, the semi-pro McCook Cats of the early 1950s had played in Eastside Park (called Felling Field today). When the McCook Braves franchise was established, a new field was immediately constructed at the Red Willow County Fairgrounds with help from local clubs and organizations. The field was dubbed Cibola Field after the seven cities of Cibola. The ballpark had a capacity of 2,500 (1956) and 1,000 (1959). Still in use today as host to the Red Willow County fair, the Willow County Fairgrounds are located on West 5th Street in McCook.

== Media ==
The 1959 McCook Braves season is chronicled in the book A False Spring, written by McCook player Pat Jordan. Jordan eventually retired from baseball to become a writer and an author.ISBN 0-80-327626-5

== Timeline ==
| Year(s) | # Yrs. | Team | Level | League | Affiliate |
|---|---|---|---|---|---|
| 1903 | 1 | McCook | Independent | Central Nebraska League | None |
| 1928–1932 | 5 | McCook Generals | Class D | Nebraska State League | None |
| 1956–1959 | 4 | McCook Braves | Class D | Nebraska State League | Milwaukee Braves |

== Year–by–year records ==
| Year | Record | Finish | Manager | Playoffs |
|---|---|---|---|---|
| 1956 | 35–28 | 4th | Bill Steinecke | No playoffs held |
| 1957 | 27–29 | 6th | Bill Steinecke | No playoffs held |
| 1958 | 40–23 | 2nd | Bill Steinecke | No playoffs held |
| 1959 | 43–19 | 1st | Bill Steinecke | League champions |

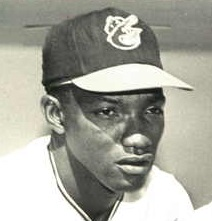
Elrod Hendricks, 1968

== Notable alumni ==
- Phil Niekro (1959) Inducted Baseball Hall of Fame, 1997
- Luis Alcaraz (1959)
- Les Barnhart (1928)
- Andy Bednar (1929)
- Doc Bennett (1929–1931, MGR)
- Bruce Brubaker (1959)
- Elrod Hendricks (1959) Baltimore Orioles Hall of Fame
- Ron Hunt (1959) 2x MLB All-Star
- Pat Jordan (1959) Author, A False Spring.
- Mike Kreevich (1930)
- Hector Martinez (1957)
- Harry Matuzak (1931)
- Hugh Mendez (1959)
- Spud Owen (1930)
- Harlan Pyle (1928)
- Merritt Ranew (1957)
- Bill Steinecke (1956–1959, MGR)
- John Stoneham (1928)
- George Washington (1931)

== See also ==
- McCook Braves players
