= Bill Littlefield =

William Littlefield (born July 1948) is an American radio personality and sportswriter. He was the host of National Public Radio and WBUR's Only A Game program from its beginning in 1993 to July 2018, covering mainstream and offbeat United States and international sports. Littlefield joined NPR in 1984.

A graduate of Phillips Academy, Yale University and the Harvard University Graduate School of Education, Littlefield taught English at Curry College for 39 years and was a writer-in-residence there.

“Take Me Out”, Bill's collection of sport-and-games-related doggerel, was published in 2014, and in January 2015, Library of America published The Best of W.C. Heinz, which Bill edited, and for which he wrote the introduction. His other books include Only A Game and Keepers, both collections of his radio and magazine work. Littlefield has also authored three novels, Prospect and The Circus in the Woods, and Baseball Days and Champions: Stories of Ten Remarkable Athletes. He was the guest editor for Houghton Mifflin’s Best American Sports Writing in 1998, and his essay “The Gym At Third and Ross” was featured in the 2013 edition. He also writes a bi-monthly column in The Boston Globe in which he reviews sports books.

In addition to penning his own books, Littlefield served as the guest editor of the 1998 edition of The Best American Sports Writing.

== Books ==
- Prospect (1989)
- Champions: Stories of Ten Remarkable Athletes (1993)
- Baseball Days (1993)
- Keepers (1998)
- Best American Sports Writing (1998 ed.)
- The Circus in the Woods (2002)
- Fall Classics ed. (2003)
- Only a Game (2007)
- Take Me Out (2014)
- The Top of His Game: The Best Sportswriting of W.C. Heinz, ed. (2015)
- Mercy (2022) Black Rose Writing

   Who Taught That Mouse To Write, 2025, Writing Mouse Press
