= Wahpeton–Breckenridge Twins =

- 1921–1922; Wahpeton, North Dakota

Minor league affiliations
- Class: Class D (1921–1922)
- League: Dakota League (1921–1922)

Major league affiliations
- Team: None

Minor league titles
- League titles (0): None

Team data
- Name: Wahpeton–Breckenridge Twins (1921–1922)
- Ballpark: Chahinkapa Park* (1921–1922)

The Wahpeton–Breckenridge Twins were a minor league baseball team based in Wahpeton, North Dakota and Breckenridge, Minnesota. In 1921 and 1922, the Twins played as members of the Class D level Dakota League. The Twins were preceded in minor league play by the 1897 Wahpeton–Breckenridge Methodists.

== History ==
Wahpeton–Breckenridge first hosted minor league baseball in 1897. The Red River Valley League played a partial minor league baseball in 1897 as a Class F level league. The Fargo Divorcees/Fargo Red Stockings, Grand Forks Black Stockings,Moorhead Barmaids, and Wahpeton–Breckenridge Methodists teams were the league members. The league permanently folded on August 8, 1897 with Wahpeton–Breckenridge in third place in the standings.

The Wahpeton–Breckenridge "Twins" began minor league play in 1921 and caused a change in the league name. The South Dakota League changed names to become the "Dakota League", after adding the Wahpeton–Breckenridge Twins franchise, based in neighboring border cities in North Dakota and Minnesota.

Baseball play on Sunday had been illegal in North Dakota until the law was repealed in 1920, a positive for early professional teams, who needed the revenue from Sunday crowds to be financially viable. Wahpeton, North Dakota newspaper publisher Robert J. Hughes formed the new Wahpeton–Breckenridge franchise. After forming the franchise and being admitted to the league, Hughes hired Roy Patterson to serve as the Twins' manager.

The 1921 Dakota League remained an eight–team Class D level league, with 13–player rosters for each team. The Twins joined the Aberdeen Grays, Huron Packers, Madison Greys, Mitchell Kernels, Redfield Red Sox, Sioux Falls Soos and Watertown Cubs teams in beginning league play on May 20, 1921.

In their first season of play, the Twins ended the season in third place. With a record of 55–43, the Twins finished 10.5 games behind the first place Mitchell Kernels in the final standings. Roy Patterson managed the Twins.

The Twins played their final season in 1922. The Dakota League continued play as an eight–team Class D level league, adding the Fargo Athletics, Jamestown Jimkotans and Valley City Hi-Liners as new league franchises. The Wahpeton–Breckenridge Twins, Aberdeen Grays, Mitchell Kernels, Sioux Falls Soos and Watertown Cubs returned as members.

With a record of 42–55, playing under returning manager Roy Patterson, the Twins finished in 7th place. Mitchell defended their championship and ended the 1922 season with a 60–37 record to finish 18.0 games ahead of the Twins in the final standings.

The Twins did not return to play in 1923, as the Dakota League split into two four–team partner leagues to condense travel. The new 1923 leagues were called the North Dakota League and South Dakota League.

Wahpeton–Breckenridge has not hosted another minor league team.

== The ballpark ==
The name and location of the home minor league ballpark for the Wahpeton–Breckenridge Twins is not directly referenced. Chahinkapa Park in Wahpeton was in use in the era, having been purchased from the Federal Government in 1903. Coincidently, the Twins' owner, Robert J. Hughes was the director of the park, which evolved to host a zoo.

== Timeline ==
Year(s)	# Yrs.	Team	Level	League
1920–1921	2	Wahpeton–Breckenridge Twins	Class D	Dakota League

== Year–by–year records ==
Year	Record	Finish	Manager	Playoffs/notes
1921	55–43	3rd	Roy Patterson	No playoffs held
1922	42–55	7th	Roy Patterson	No playoffs held

== Notable alumni ==
- Roy Patterson (1921, MGR)

== See also ==
- Wahpeton–Breckenridge Methodists
