= Fargo–Moorhead Graingrowers =

- 1914–1917; (1902–1906, 1908, 1914–1917, 1922); Fargo, North Dakota

Minor league affiliations
- Class: Class D (1902-1905); Class C (1906, 1908, 1914–1916); Class D (1917, 1922)
- League: Northern League (1902–1905); Northern-Copper Country League (1908); Northern League (1914–1917); Dakota League (1922)

Major league affiliations
- Team: None

Minor league titles
- League titles (2): 1915; 1917
- Conference titles (1): 1916

Team data
- Name: Fargo (1902–1905); Fargo Trolley Dodgers (1906); Fargo Browns (1908); Fargo-Moorhead Graingrowers (1914–1917); Fargo Athletics (1922)
- Ballpark: Fargo field (1902–1906, 1908); Island Park (1914–1917, 1922)

The Fargo–Moorhead Graingrowers were a minor league baseball team based in Fargo, North Dakota in partnership with neighboring Moorhead, Minnesota. From 1914 to 1917, the "Graingrowers" played exclusively as members of the Class C level Northern League, winning league championships in 1915 and 1917 and a pennant in 1916.

The Graingrowers were managed to the 1915 Northern League championship and 1916 pennant by Bob Unglaub, who died in a railroad accident following the 1916 season. After his death, Unglaub was replaced as manager by Denny Sullivan, his former teammate with the Boston Red Sox. Sullivan led Fargo-Moorhead to the 1917 championship.

The Fargo team first began a tenure of Northern League playing from 1902 to 1906, before Fargo joined the 1908 Northern-Copper Country League for one season when the Northern League restructured. Following the Graingrowers, the Fargo Athletics played the 1922 season as members of the Class D level Dakota League.

The Fargo-Moorhead Graingrowers hosted Northern League minor league home games at Island Park in Fargo beginning in 1914. Fargo hosted early Northern League games at the Fargo field.

== History ==
=== Early teams ===
In a meeting held at the Headquarters Hotel on March 31, 1875, the Red River Baseball Club was founded in Fargo. The baseball team was founded just two months after Fargo, North Dakota was formally established as a city. The baseball club name corresponds with the local Red River, which runs between Fargo, North Dakota and Moorhead, Minnesota, separating the two state border towns.

Fargo first hosted minor league baseball in 1897. The Fargo-Moorhead area was represented in the 1897 Class F level Red River Valley League by both the Fargo Divorcees and Moorhead Barmaids teams, who were the first area minor league franchises. The Grand Forks Senators and Wahpeton-Breckenridge Methodists were the other two league franchises. In a shortened season that began on May 26, 1897, Moorhead won the league championship in 1897 with a 32–13 record, while Fargo finished last in the four-team league 15.5 games behind with a 17–29 record. The Red River Valley League ended play on July 31, 1897.

On July 18, 1891, the Fargo Red Stockings and Grand Forks Black Stockings teams played a 25–inning game that ended in a 0–0 tie. The teams were members of the semi-professional Red River Valley League, and the game was played in 4 hours and 10-minutes, as the second game of a doubleheader. The doubleheader was played at neutral site after Grand Forks owner Tom Hill relocated the series to the North Dakota State Militia Training Grounds in Devils Lake, North Dakota, hoping for a large crowd to attend. Pitchers William Gibbs of Grand Forks and George Raymer of Fargo each pitched a record 25 scoreless innings in the game. The game is the longest known scoreless tie in baseball history. The tie occurred when the umpire ended the game after the completion of the 25th inning because both teams had trains to catch. The 25th inning concluded at 8:10 pm.

=== 1902: First Northern League season ===
Fargo resumed minor league play in 1902, when the "Fargo" team became charter members of the six-team Independent level Northern League. The Cavalier, Crookston Crooks, Devil's Lake, Grand Forks Forkers and Winnipeg Maroons teams joined with Fargo to form the six-team independent league. The league schedule began on May 22, 1902.

As was common in the era, the Fargo team had no formal nickname and were sometimes referred to as the "Fargo Nines."

On May 22, 1902, Fargo opened their Northern League season against the Crookston Crooks in the season opener. Crookston won the game by the score of 16–8. Reilly was the losing pitcher for Fargo in their opening game.

In their first season of Northern League play, the 1902 Fargo team ended the season in third place as the league began the season as a six-team league but ended the season with four teams. Ending the season with a 30–26 record, Fargo placed third of the remaining four teams in the Northern League final standings. On July 21, 1902, the Cavalier and Devil's Lake teams folded and the Northern League was left with four remaining teams. On July 26, 1902, the league ended the season. In the final standings when the league stopped play, Fargo ended their season 3.5 games behind the first place Winnipeg Maroons (37–20) in the final standings. At age 24, the Fargo player-manager was Oscar Bandelin. In part-time duty appearing in 29 games, Bandelin batted .421 in 114 at bats for Fargo.

A graduate of the University of Wisconsin, Oscar Bandelin was the player-manager for Fargo in 1902, while simultaneously serving as the Wisconsin Badgers baseball head coach in 1902 and 1903. Bandelin coached the 1902 Badgers team which captured the Big Ten Conference championship. A military veteran, Bandelin began practicing as attorney in 1908 in Sandpoint, Idaho and resided there until his death.

Denny Sullivan played for Fargo in 1902, his first professional season at age 19 and his first of three separate stints with the franchise. Sullivan began the 1902 season with Fargo and then remained in the Northern League, playing the rest of the season with Winnipeg. Sullivan batted .331 for the season, second best in the Northern League. After playing for the Washington Nationals, Boston Red Sox and Cleveland Naps between 1905 and 1909, Sullivan later returned to Fargo in 1914 after his time as a player in the major leagues. Sullivan then managed the 1917 Fargo-Moorehead team.

=== 1903 to 1905: Northern League ===
Fargo continued Northern League play in 1903 as the league became a six-team, Class D level league. The Cavalier and Devil's Lake teams did not return to the league, as the Duluth Cardinals and Superior Longshoremen replaced them and joined the returning Crookston Crooks, Fargo, Grand Forks Forkers and Winnipeg Maroons teams in beginning the Northern League schedule on May 20, 1903. Fargo ended the 1903 season in fifth place with a final record of 36–61, while playing the season under managers Tommy Reynolds, George Pirie and Spencer Abbott. The first place Winnipeg Maroons ended the season 31.0 games ahead of Fargo in the final Northern League standings.

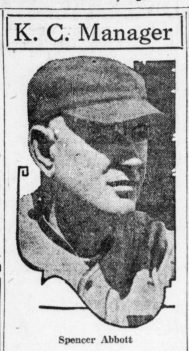
(1926) Spencer Abbott, manager Kansas City Blues. Abbott was a player/manager for Fargo in 1903, his first manager position. Abbott would manage in the minor leagues through 1947, winning over 2,100 games in his career.

After beginning the 1903 season as a player for the Superior Longshoremen, catcher Spencer Abbott was obtained and became the Fargo player/manager, hitting .286 on the season at age 25. His stint as the Fargo manager was his first manager job. In 1904, Abbott became the player/manager of the Topeka Saints of the Missouri Valley League. Beginning with his season in Fargo, Spencer embarked on a lengthy career as a minor league player and manager spanning five different decades, last managing the 1947 Charlotte Hornets at age 69. Overall, Abbott managed in 34 minor league seasons, compiling a record of 2,180–2,037. He also served as a scout for the Washington Senators during his baseball career.

Catcher Jimmy Archer played for Fargo in 1903. In his first professional season at age 20, Archer batted .225 in 20 games for Fargo. Following his 1903 season with Fargo, Archer made his major league debut with the 1904 Pittsburgh Pirates and played in the major leagues for 12 seasons, nine with the Chicago Cubs.

In 1904, Perry Werden became the Fargo player/manager. Following his major league career, Werden continued to play in the minor leagues for a number of years. In 1894, while playing for the Minneapolis Millers of the Western League, Werden batted .417 with 42 home runs. In 1895, he hit .428 with 45 home runs. No professional player would hit more than 29 until Babe Ruth hit 54 for the New York Yankees in 1920. Werden retired with a career .341 batting average with five home run titles in the minor leagues.

On July 14, 1905, Fargo pitcher Hawley Souders pitched a 10-inning no-hitter. Souders defeated the Grand Forks Forkers 1–0 in the game and had 1 walk and 3 strikeouts in his no-hitter.

In mid-July of the 1904 season, Fargo immediately released the team’s five highest-paid players, including Lee DeMontreville, and replaced them with local area players. A few days later manager Perry Werden quit and DeMontreville was brought back to manage Fargo.

In their controversial season, Fargo continued play as members of the 1904 Class D level Northern League and ended the season in last place in the six-team league. Fargo finished the season with a 29–48 record, placing sixth in the Northern League, playing the season under managers Werden and DeMontreville. Fargo ended the season 28.0 games behind first place Duluth White Sox in the final standings.

Replacing Perry Werden as manager during the 1904 season, Lee DeMontreville had played shortstop for the St. Louis Cardinals in 1903, his only season of major league baseball, appearing in 26 games with a .243 batting average in 26 games. Following his season with Fargo, DeMontreville became the player/manager of the 1905 Charleston Sea Gulls of the South Atlantic League in his final season in professional baseball at age 30. Following his release by Charleston, DeMontreville left professional baseball. After working as a grocer, he became the postmaster in Bardonia, New York until his retirement. In 1936, he was found guilty of operating a chain of unregistered stills and received a suspended sentence.

Fargo placed third in the 1905 Northern League in 1905, as the league continued play as a six-team Class D level league. With a record of 51–45 in the final Northern League standings, Fargo played the season under managers Charles Traeger and W. J. Price. Fargo ended the season 28.0 games behind the first place Duluth White Sox in the final standings, as Duluth won their second consecutive league championship. Pitcher Peter Hanson of Fargo led the Northern League with 24 wins. The Northern League did not return to play in 1906, with some member teams merging with a new league.

=== 1906: Northern-Copper Country League / Fargo Trolley Dodgers ===
Fargo continued play in 1906 in a new league when the Northern League merged with the Copper Country Soo League to become the Northern-Copper Country League, with the Fargo "Trolley Dodgers" becoming a charter member. In 1905, the Copper Country Soo League began play as a four-team league after hopes of merging with the Northern League that season proved unsuccessful. In 1906, the league evolved into an eight-team Class C level league when, the Northern League was merged with the Copper Country Soo League to create the Northern-Copper Country League. Fargo joined with the Calumet Aristocrats, Duluth White Sox, Grand Forks Forkers, Hancock Patriots, Houghton Giants, Lake Linden Lakers and Winnipeg Maroons teams to begin the league schedule on May 17, 1906.

Fargo's "Trolley Dodgers" nickname corresponds to local history. The city of Fargo began the process of developing of an electric streetcar system for the city in 1902. The first electric streetcar went into service on Thanksgiving of 1904. The neighboring city of Moorhead was included in the trolley system that was constructed in six months at a cost of near $200,000. At its height, the system had 16 miles of tracks, 29 motor cars, and 16 trailers. The Fargo-Moorhead streetcar system ended service in 1937.

Matt Camitsch became the Fargo manager in 1906. Camitsch was a local Fargo businessman who also was co-owner of the ballpark in Fargo, with partners W.J. Price and Alex Stern.

The Trolley Dodgers ended their first Northern-Copper Country League season in last place after the league began play as eight-team league but folded two teams. Fargo ended the season with a final record of 35–59. The Trolley Dodgers finished the season in sixth place in the final standings after both Hancock and Grand Forks folded on July 23, 1908. Playing the season under manager Matt Camitsch, Fargo ended the season 24.0 games behind first place Calumet in the final standings

One year after he won 24 games pitching for Fargo, Peter Hansen returned to Fargo in 1906 and had the dubious distinction of becoming a 20-game losing pitcher. Hansen compiled a 3–23 record on the season for the Trolley Dodgers.

Fargo did not return to the Northern-Copper Country League in 1907, as the league reduced four teams to a four-team league without a Fargo franchise. The Calumet Aristocrats, Duluth White Sox, Houghton Giants and Winnipeg Maroons continued play in the final season for the league.

=== 1908 Fargo Browns: Northern League reforms ===
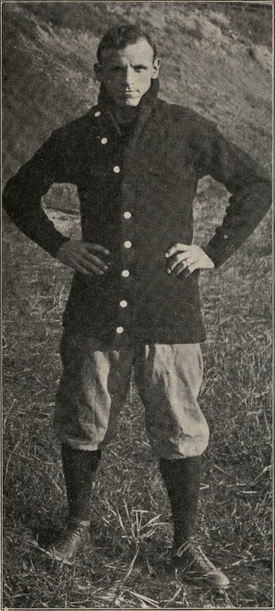
(1913) Zora Clevenger, head football coach Tennessee Volunteers. Clevenger played for Fargo in 1908 while also coaching collegiate sports. Clevenger was inducted into the College Football Hall of Fame in 1968.

With the Northern-Copper Country League folding following the 1907 season, the Northern League reformed in 1908 as a four-team Class D level league, with the Fargo "Browns" as a member. The Fargo Browns resumed Northern League membership for one season as Fargo joined the Brandon Angels, Duluth White Sox and Winnipeg Maroons teams in beginning league play on My 14, 1908. The Northern League schedule was to end on September 7, 1908, but did not play after August 13, 1908.

In their return to Northern League play, Fargo finished the shortened 1908 season in last place in the final standings. With a final record of 23–56, Fargo placed fourth in the four-team Northern League. While playing the season under managers Bernard McNeil and M. Fields, Fargo ended the season 26.0 games behind the first place Brandon Angels in the final standings.

Zora Clevenger, who later became an inducted to the College Football Hall of Fame, played for Fargo in 1908, hitting .274 in 32 games. At the time, Clevenger had just completed his first season as the baseball coach at Nebraska Wesleyan University, having previously coached both the Indiana Hoosiers baseball and Indiana Hoosiers men's basketball teams at his alma mater from 1904 to 1907. Clevinger was a football star at Indians. Following his Fargo season, Clevenger coached college football in the fall of 1908 at Nebraska Wesleyan. Clevenger continued his simultaneous baseball play and collegiate coaching in 1909, before eventually moving into full-time coaching and then into athletic administration. He served as the athletic director at Indiana from 1923 to 1946.

The Class D level Northern League continued play in 1909, but without a Fargo team. The Northern League was also referred to as the Minnesota-Wisconsin League during the 1909 season with Duluth anchoring a new membership of teams consisting of the Duluth White Sox plus the Eau Claire Cream Puffs, LaCrosse Outcasts, Superior Drillers, Wausau Lumberjacks and Winona Pirates teams.

=== 1914 to 1917 Fargo Graingrowers: Two Northern League championships ===
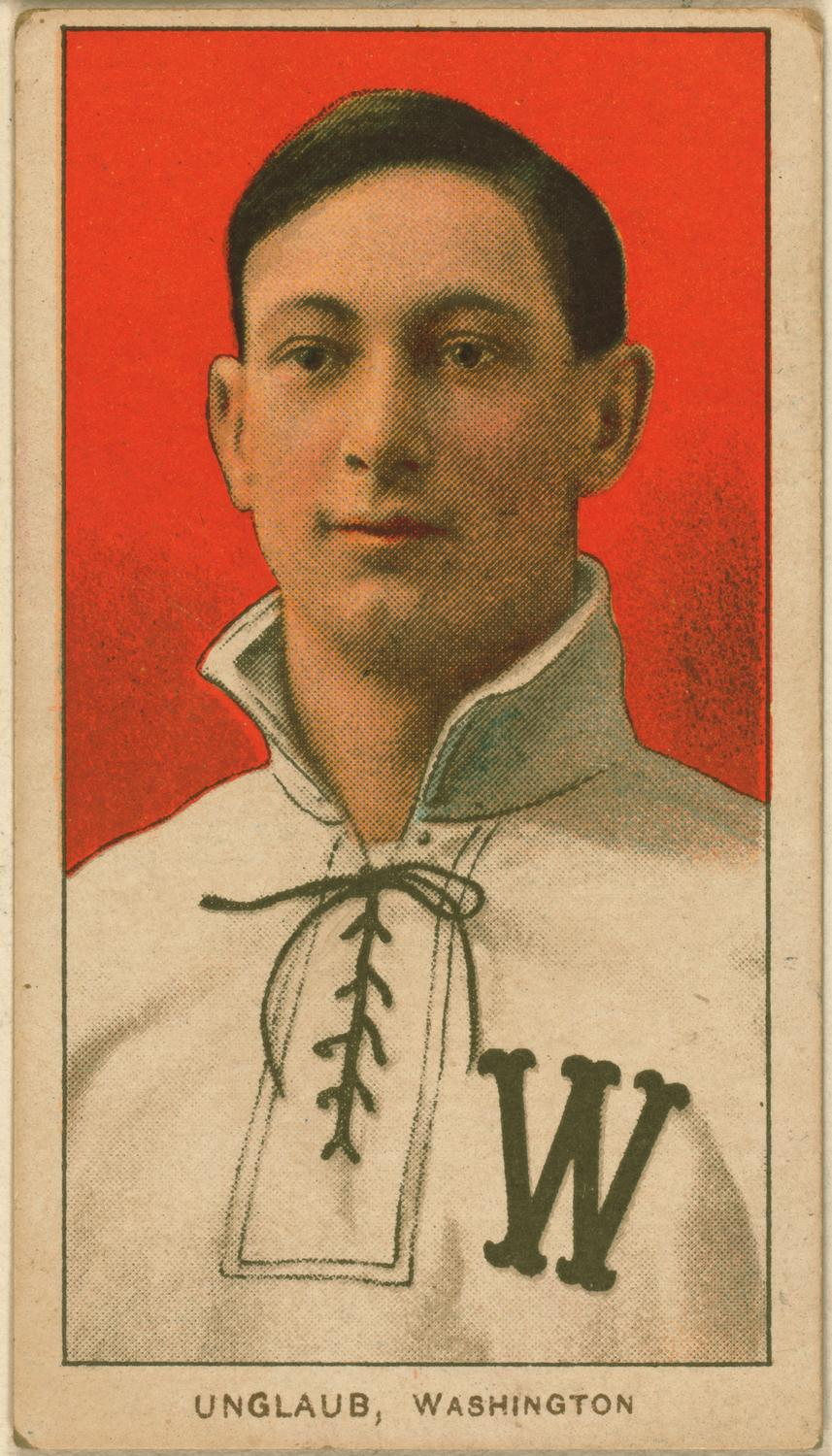
(1911) Bob Unglaub, Washington Senators, baseball card. Unglaub was player/manager of the Graingrowers from 1914 to 1916, leading the team to the 1915 league championship and 1916 pennant. Unglaub was killed in an accident following the 1916 season.

Following a five-season hiatus, minor league baseball play resumed in 1914, when the Fargo-Moorhead "Graingrowers" were formed in partnership with neighboring Moorhead, Minnesota. Fargo-Moorhead rejoined the eight-team Class C level Northern League, replacing the Minneapolis Millers franchise in the league. The Duluth White Sox, Grand Forks Flickertails, St. Paul Millers, Superior Red Sox, Virginia Ore Diggers, Winnipeg Maroons and Winona Pirates teams joined Fargo-Moorhead in beginning league play on May 6, 1914. The Northern League remained intact during World War I, while many baseball minor leagues folded during the war.

The "Graingrowers" nickname corresponds to the agricultural industry in the era in Fargo-Moorehead. Grain production has been a major part of the area's economy since the founding of the cities. Today, the Fargo-Moorhead Visitors Center is housed in a former grain elevator and honors the area's agricultural roots.

In their return to the Northern League, Bob Unglaub became the Fargo-Moorhead manager for the 1914 season. Unglaub had served as the player/manager of the 1907 Boston Red Sox after Boston player-manager Chick Stahl died by suicide on March 28, 1907 whiled the team was participating in spring training in Little Rock, Arkansas. After playing his final major league season with the 1910 Washington Senators, the Senators sold Unglaub's contract to the Lincoln Railsplitters of the Western League in 1911 and he became Lincoln's player-manager. Unglaub then split the 1912 season between the Baltimore Orioles of the International League and the Minneapolis Millers of the American Association that season. In 1913, Unglaub became the player-manager for Minneapolis and remained in that position in 1914 with the Fargo-Moorhead Graingrowers, who replaced Minneapolis in Northern League play. Unglaub served as player-manager for the Graingrowers from 1914 to 1916 until his death following the 1916 season.

In their first season of play in returning to the Northern League, the 1914 Graingrowers ended the season in sixth place in the eight–team league, managed by Bob Unglaub. With a final record of 55–71, the Fargo-Moorhead Graingrowers finished 27.5 games behind the first place Duluth White Sox in the final regular season standings. The Northern League held no playoffs.

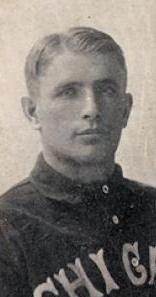
(1903) Pitcher Roy Patterson, Chicago White Sox. Patterson helped lead Fargo to the 1915 Northern League championship, compiling a 21–5 record at age 38.

On June 19, 1915, pitcher George Dumont of Fargo pitched a no-hitter against the Fort William Canadians. Dumont and Fargo won the game by the score of 1–0.

The 1915 Fargo-Moorhead Graingrowers won their first championship of the Class C level Northern League. The league began the season as an eight-team league and reduced to six teams after the Grand Forks and Superior teams folded during the season. The Graingrowers compiled a record of 74–49 to place first in the eight–team league. Playing under returning manager Bob Unglaub, the Fargo-Moorhead Graingrowers finished 6.5 games ahead of the second place St. Boniface Saints in the final standings to claim the championship as the league held no playoffs. Fargo-Moorhead had three pitchers win 20 games, headed by league leader Ralph Bell (22–13), followed by Roy Patterson (21–5) and George Dumont (20–10).

Roy Patterson of Fargo-Moorehead compiled a 21–5 record to top the league in winning percentage at .808 at age 38. Fargo teammate Ralph Bell had a record of 22–13 and lead the Northern League in wins. Bell pitched for the Chicago White Sox in 1912 at age 21 before returning to the minor leagues. Prior to his season with Fargo, Patterson had pitched for the White Sox from 1901 to 1907 and had the distinction of being the first winning pitcher in an American League game in 1901. Patterson joined Fargo after beginning the season as the player/manager for the Northern League’s Winnipeg Maroons. After Winnipeg team owner John Burmeister fired Patterson on July 8, 1915, he was quickly signed by the Fargo Graingrowers. At the time Fargo obtained Patterson, the Graingrowers were in second place, 12 games behind first place in the standings. Patterson’s pitching led the Fargo club to a 42–25 after his signing, enroute to Fargo winning the Northern League championship.

In 1916 the Class C level Northern League reduced by two teams to become six–team league to begin the season, after the St. Bonifacius Saints and Grand Forks Flickertails franchises did not return to the league. On July 10, 1916, there was a league realignment involving the Virginia Ore Diggers, who had compiled a record of 28–32, and had won 11 of their previous 16 games while playing under manager Lefty Davis. On July 10, 1916, the Fort William Canadians team folded due to financial difficulties with a record of 22–39, leaving the Northern League with an uneven five teams. The league owners determined that the league would not subsidize continuing the Fort William team and that another existing team would need be folded to keep an even number of teams in the league. It was discussed that either Virginia or Fargo-Moorhead would be the team to be folded. It then was determined that the Virginia team would be folded immediately over the desire of the Virginia owners and fans who wanted to continue play.

Fargo pitcher Charlie Boardman pitched a no-hitter on June 19, 1916. Boardman faced the Duluth White Sox in a game that was suspended with the score of 0–0 after 8 innings.

After surviving the league contraction the previous season, Fargo continued Northern League play with the four remaining teams and ended the 1916 season in second place in the overall standings, while winning a pennant, as the league played a split season schedule. The Graingrowers ended the season with an overall record of 68-47, playing under returning manager Bob Unglaub in his final season with the team. Fargo-Moorhead finished 2.5 games behind the first place Winnipeg Maroons in the final Northern League standings overall, followed by the Superior Red Sox and Duluth Dukes. The league designed a split season schedule with the changes during the season. Winnipeg won the first half pennant and Fargo won the second half pennant. The two teams then met in a playoff, where Fargo-Moorhead and Winnipeg were tied at 2-games each, when the playoff was abandoned.

Following the 1916 season, Bob Unglaub was killed in an off-season accident. While at work as an engineer, he was crushed to death in a railroad incident. Unglaub had earned a degree in Engineering from the University of Maryland. In the offseason from baseball, Unglaub worked as an engineer for the Pennsylvania Railroad shops in his hometown of Baltimore, Maryland. On November 29, 1916, he was supervising work on a railroad locomotive when an accident occurred. Unglaub was crushed and his body mangled in the accident, killing him at age 36.

In his third tenure with the franchise, Dr. Denny Sullivan returned to Fargo after playing for the St. Joseph Drummers in 1916, hitting .315. Following the death of Bob Unglaub, Sullivan became the Graingrowers' player-manager in 1917. Unglaub and Sullivan had been teammates with the Boston Red Sox in 1907 and 1908. Sullivan had recently served as the head coach of the collegiate Minnesota Golden Gophers baseball team in 1913 and 1914 before establishing a medical practice. Sullivan then returned to baseball with his position with the Graingrowers. Sullivan chose to return to Fargo after also being offered the player/manager position with the Hannibal Mules team in the Illinois–Indiana–Iowa League. Sullivan made the Fargo choice because "a better opening for his medical practice was offered in the Dakota city."

With Danny Sullivan as manager, Fargo won the 1917 Northern League championship in a shortened season. The Northern League began the season as a four-team league, one of eight Class D level leagues to begin the 1917 season. The league members were the returning Fargo and Winnipeg teams joined by the newly formed Minot Why Nots and Warren Wanderers. Before the end of the season, the Northern League folded on July 2, 1917. At the time the league folded, Fargo was in first place with a 36-16 record, playing the season under Denny Sullivan. The Graingrowers finished 12.0 games ahead of the second place Winnipeg Maroons (24–26) in the final standings, followed by the Minot Why Nots (19–23) and Warren Wanderers (16–30).

At age 34, the 1917 season was Denny Sullivan's final season in professional baseball. Sullivan served in the U.S. Army during both World War I and World War II, while also maintaining his medical practice.

The Northern League did not return to play in 1918, folding following the end of the 1917 season. The Northern League was later reformed in 1933 with Fargo as a member. Fargo would resume minor league play in 1922 in a new league.

=== 1922 Fargo Athletics: Dakota League ===
In 1922, minor league baseball resumed when the Fargo "Athletics" played the season as charter members of the eight-team, Class D level Dakota League for one season. The Aberdeen Grays, Jamestown Jimkotans, Mitchell Kernels, Sioux Falls Soos, Valley City Hi-Liners, Wahpeton-Breckenridge Twins and Watertown Cubs teams joined with Fargo in beginning the Dakota League schedule on May 20, 1922. Fargo, Jamestown and Valley City were all new members of the league, which began play in the 1921 season, evolving from the 1920 South Dakota League.

Fargo attorney William H. Barnett was the owner and founder of the Fargo Athletics. Barnett was the namesake of the former Barnett Field in Fargo. The 1922 Fargo Athletics were managed by Ed Whiting, hired by Barnett. Managing Fargo at age 62, Whiting started his professional baseball career in 1881, playing with the Philadelphia Athletics of the Eastern Championship Association before playing three seasons in the major leagues with the Baltimore Orioles and Louisville Colonels through 1885.

In Dakota League play, Fargo ended the 1922 season in a tie for second place. with a final record of 56–42 record and finished in a second-place tie, having the identical record as the Aberdeen Grays at the conclusion of the season. Aberdeen had Baseball Hall of Fame member Al Simmons on their team, playing in his first professional season. Fargo and Aberdeen both finished 4.5 games behind the first place Mitchell Kernels in the final standings. No league playoffs were held.

In the 1923 season, the Fargo franchise did not return to the Dakota League, as the league reduced to four-teams, dropping the Fargo, Jamestown, Valley City and Wahpeton-Breckenridge teams. Aberdeen, Mitchell, Sioux Falls and Watertown played the final season of the league, which permanently folded on July 13, 1923. The Dakota League had continued play in 1923 without a Fargo franchise, and the league was restructured and divided into the North Dakota League and South Dakota League in July 1923. Ed Whiting became the manager of the Jamestown Jimkotas in his final season in professional baseball.

Minor league baseball resumed in 1933, when the Fargo-Moorhead Twins began a lengthy tenure of play as members of the Northern League as the league reformed for the 1933 season for the first time since 1917. The 1933 league resumed play with the Brainerd Muskies, Brandon Grays, Crookston Pirates, East Grand Forks Colts, Eau Claire Cardinals, Fargo-Moorhead Twins, Superior Blues and Winnipeg Maroons as members. The Twins played from 1933 to 1942 and 1946 to 1960 and were a minor an affiliate of the Cleveland Indians (1934–1940, 1953–1957), Pittsburgh Pirates (1947–1948) and New York Yankees (1958–1960) during their next tenure of Northern League play.

== The ballparks ==
=== Fargo field ===
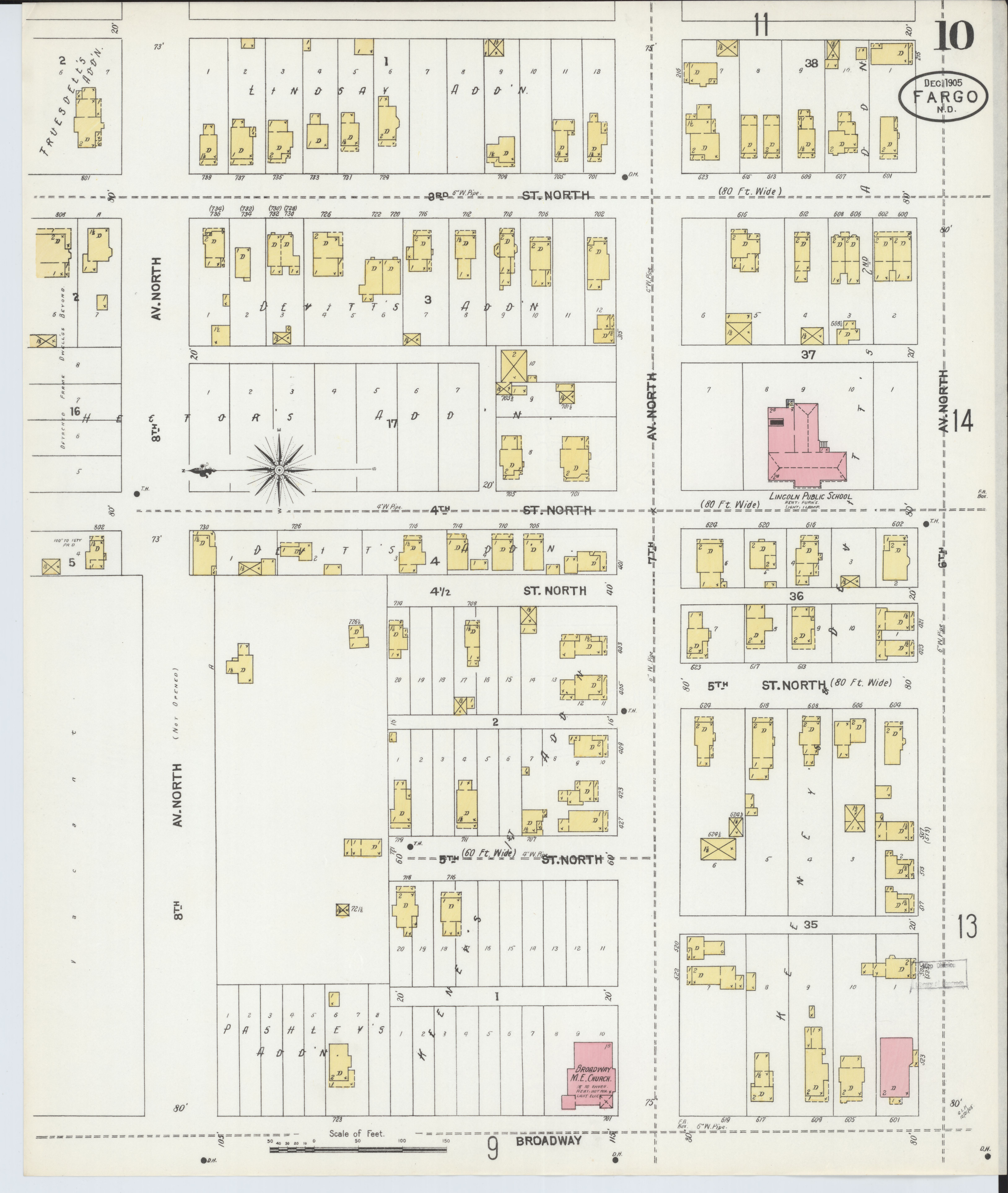
(1905) Sanborn Fire Insurance Map 06536 005.5-10. Fargo, North Dakota. Shows the field at Broadway & Eighth.

From 1902 through 1908, Fargo minor league teams hosted home games at a ballfield that later evolved into a hospital site.

In 1908, when the Northern League first disbanded, St. Luke's Hospital was built on the former ballpark parcel. Now demolished, the former St. Luke's Hospital was located on the corner of North Broadway at Eighth Avenue in Fargo.

=== Island Park ===
Beginning in 1914, the Fargo-Moorhead Graingrowers and subsequent teams hosted home minor league home games at a ballpark site on Island Park.

Island Park is Fargo's oldest public park. The park was part of the original townsite of Fargo that was plotted out by the Northern Pacific Railroad. Platted in 1877, the Island Park parcel was gifted to the city of Fargo from the Northern Pacific Railway.

Still in use today as a public park with amenities, Island Park is located at 302 7th Street South in Fargo, North Dakota.

== Timeline ==
Year(s)	# Yrs.	Team	Level	League	Ballpark
1902–1905	4	Fargo	Class D	Northern League	Fargo field
1906	1	Fargo Trolley Dodgers	Class D	Northern Copper County League	Fargo field
1908	1	Fargo Browns	Class C	Northern League	Fargo field
1914–1917	4	Fargo-Moorhead Graingrowers	Class C	Northern League	Island Park
1922	1	Fargo Athletics	Class D	Dakota League	Island Park

== Year–by–year records ==
Year	Record	Finish	Manager	Playoffs/Notes
1902	30–26	3rd	Oscar Bandelin	No playoffs held
1903	36–61	5th	Tommy Reynolds / George Pirie; Spencer Abbott	No playoffs held
1904	29–48	6th	Perry Werden / Lee DeMontreville	No playoffs held
1905	51–45	3rd	Charles Traeger / W. J. Price	No playoffs held
1906	35–59	6th	Matt Camitsch	No playoffs held
1908	25–56	4th	Bernard McNeil / M. Fields	No playoffs held
1914	55–71	6th	Bob Unglaub	No playoffs held
1915	74–49	1st	Bob Unglaub	League champions No playoffs held
1916	68–47	2nd	Bob Unglaub	Won 2nd half pennant Playoff: Cancelled tied 2 games each
1917	36–16	1st	Denny Sullivan	League champions League disbanded July 10
1922	56–42	2nd (t)	Ed Whiting	No playoffs held

== Notable alumni ==
- Zora Clevenger (1908) Inducted, College Football Hall of Fame 1968
- Spencer Abbott (1903, MGR)
- Jimmy Archer (1903)
- Jim Banning (1897)
- Ralph Bell (1915–1916)
- Charlie Boardman (1916)
- Bob Brush (1897)
- Bill Carney (1902)
- Biddy Dolan (1905)
- Adam DeBus (1916–1917)
- Lee DeMontreville (1904, MGR)
- George Dumont (1914)
- Harry LaRoss (1922)
- Bee Lawler (1915)
- Moxie Meixell (1916–1917)
- Doc Miller (1906)
- Red Nelson (1915)
- Roy Patterson (1915)
- Deacon Phillippe (1897)
- Josh Reilly (1897)
- Denny Sullivan (1902, 1914; 1917, MGR)
- Bob Unglaub (1914–1916, MGR)
- Perry Werden (1904, MGR)
- Dwight Wertz (1914)
- Ed Whiting (1922, MGR)

== See also ==
- Fargo-Moorhead Graingrowers players
- Fargo Athletics players
- Fargo (minor league baseball) players
- Fargo Divorcees players
