= South Dakota League =

Minor League Baseball league

- Formerly: Dakota League (1921–1922)
- Classification: Class D (1920–1923)
- Sport: Minor League Baseball
- Founder: Michael E. Cantillon
- First season: 1920
- Folded: July 17, 1923
- President: Michael E. Cantillon (1920–1923); Logan Powell (1923)
- No. of teams: 16
- Country: United States of America
- Most titles: 3 Mitchell Kernels (1920–1922)
- Related competitions: North Dakota League (1923)

The South Dakota League was a Class D level minor league baseball league that played from 1920 to 1923. The South Dakota League changed its name to the shortened Dakota League for the 1921 and 1922 seasons. The South Dakota League consisted of teams based in South Dakota. Franchises from Minnesota and North Dakota were added during the two Dakota League seasons. For the 1923 season, the league was divided into two four–team Class D partner entities, the South Dakota League and the North Dakota League.

== History ==
In 1920, the South Dakota League began play as an eight–team Class D level league, with all franchises based in South Dakota. The league would play four seasons and provided the first professional baseball in South Dakota since Sioux Falls played in the 1902–1903 Iowa-South Dakota League. The 1920 South Dakota League charter franchises were the Aberdeen Boosters, Huron Packers, Madison Greys, Miller Climbers, Mitchell Kernels, Redfield Reds, Sioux Falls Soos and Wessington Springs Saints.

The league president for the duration of the South Dakota League/Dakota League was Michael E. Cantillon. Cantillon had been president of the minor league Minneapolis Millers from 1907 to 1918 and was the brainchild behind the formation of the South Dakota League.

In the first season for the South Dakota League, the Mitchell Kernels won the 1920 South Dakota League Championship, their first of three consecutive championships. Mitchell had a 61–36 record under Manager Hank Scharnweber, finishing 3.5 games ahead of the Sioux Falls Soos in the regular season standings to claim the title, as the league had no playoffs for its duration. Baseball Hall of Fame member Jim Bottomley, at age 20, played for the 1920 Mitchell Kernels. Bottomley hit .312 with 7 home runs in 97 games.

In 1921, the league changed names to the Dakota League, reforming after adding the Wahpeton–Breckenridge Twins, based in North Dakota and Minnesota. Baseball play on Sunday had been illegal in North Dakota until the law was repealed in 1920, a positive for early professional teams, who needed the revenue from large Sunday crowds to remain financially viable. Wahpeton, North Dakota newspaper publisher Robert J. Hughes formed the new Wahpeton-Breckenridge, Minnesota franchise, hiring Roy Patterson as manager. The Dakota league remained an eight–team Class D level league, with 13–player rosters. The 1921 league members were the Aberdeen Grays, Huron Packers, Madison Greys, Mitchell Kernels, Redfield Red Sox, Sioux Falls Soos, Wahpeton–Breckenridge Twins and Watertown Cubs. The Mitchell Kernels won their second consecutive league championship, again finishing ahead of the 2nd place Sioux Fall Soos.

Continuing play as an eight–team Class D level league, the 1922 Dakota League season saw the Mitchell Kernels claim the championship, their third consecutive title. The Fargo Athletics, Jamestown Jimkotans and Valley City Hi-Liners became new league franchises in 1922, joining the Aberdeen Grays, Mitchell Kernels, Sioux Falls Soos, Wahpeton-Breckenridge Twins and Watertown Cubs. H.E. Ross founded the Jamestown Jinkotas, with former St. Louis Browns player Wib Smith serving as the Jamestown manager. J.H. Sampson served as president the Valley City Hi-Liners, with Charlie Boardman beginning the season as manager. Fargo attorney William H. Barnett was the founder of the Fargo Athletics and hired former major league player Ed Whiting to manage Fargo. On August 25, 1922, Roy Birkenstock of Jamestown threw a no-hitter in a 2–0 win over the Sioux Falls Soos. This was the league's first no–hitter. Mitchell finished the 1922 season with a 60–37 record under Manager Hank Scharnweber, 4.5 games ahead of the tied second place teams, the Aberdeen Greys and Fargo Athletics. Baseball Hall of Fame member Al Simmons played for the 1922 Aberdeen Greys. At age 20, Simmons led the Dakota League with 144 hits, while batting .365 with 10 home runs.

In their final season of 1923, the Dakota League split into two four–team partner entities to condense travel, with the leagues called the North Dakota League and South Dakota League.

The 1923 South Dakota League began play as a four–team Class D level league with the Aberdeen Grays, Mitchell Kernels, Sioux Falls Soos and Watertown Cubs as member franchises. The North Dakota League formed the counterpart four–team Class D league, comprising the returning Jamestown Jimkotas, and three new franchises, the Minot Magicians, New Rockford-Carrington Twins/Valley City Hi-Liners and Bismarck Capitals. The 1923 North Dakota League president was Logan Powell. On May 26, 1923, George Dennison of the Minot Magicians threw a no–hitter against the Bismarck Capitals in a 2–1 victory. The South Dakota League folded on July 17, 1923, with the Sioux Falls Soos in 1st place with a 35–22 record, 0.5 games ahead of the Aberdeen Greys. The Minot Magicians led the North Dakota League standings with a 48–21 record at the conclusion of the North Dakota League season, 15.0 games ahead of the 2nd place Jamestown Jimkotas. Both leagues permanently folded after the 1923 season.

== Cities represented ==
Team name	City represented	Ballpark	Year(s) active
Aberdeen Boosters (1920); Aberdeen Grays (1921–1923)	Aberdeen, South Dakota	Johnson Field	1920 to 1923
Bismarck Capitals	Bismarck, North Dakota	Bismarck Municipal Ballpark	1923
Fargo Athletics	Fargo, North Dakota	Island Park	1922
Huron Packers	Huron, South Dakota	Athletic Park	1920 to 1921
Jamestown Jimkotans	Jamestown, North Dakota	Unknown	1922
Madison Greys	Madison, South Dakota	Baughman Park	1920 to 1921
Miller Climbers; Miller Jugglers	Miller, South Dakota	Crystal Park	1920
Minot Magicians	Minot, North Dakota	Unknown	1923
Mitchell Kernels	Mitchell, South Dakota	Hitchcock Park	1920 to 1923
New Rockford-Carrington Twins	New Rockford, North Dakota; Carrington, North Dakota	Pioneer Park	1923
Redfield Red Sox (1920); Redfield Reds (1920–1921)	Redfield, South Dakota	College Park; Armadale Park	1920 to 1921
Sioux Falls Canaries(1920); Sioux Falls Soos (1921–1923)	Sioux Falls, South Dakota	Nelson Field	1920 to 1923
Valley City Hi-Liners	Valley City, North Dakota	Pioneer Park	1922 to 1923
Wahpeton–Breckenridge Twins	Wahpeton, North Dakota; Breckenridge, Minnesota	Unknown	1921 to 1922
Watertown Cubs	Watertown, South Dakota	Riverside Park	1921 to 1923
Wessington Springs Saints	Wessington Springs, South Dakota	Wessington Springs City Park	1920

== Standings & statistics ==
=== 1920 South Dakota League ===
Team standings	W	L	PCT	GB	Managers
Mitchell Kernels	61	36	.629	–	Hank Scharnweber
Sioux Falls Soos	58	40	.592	3½	Fred Carisch
Huron Packers	56	40	.483	4½	Bill Shipke
Wessington Springs Saints	49	48	.505	12	Mattie McGrath
Redfield Reds/Red Sox	46	49	.484	14	Ollie Pickering / Harry Halstead
Madison Greys	42	50	.457	16½	Ralph Works / Dave Altizer
Aberdeen Boosters	42	54	.438	18½	Dave Altizer / Ed Karger
Miller Climbers/Jugglers	28	65	.301	31	Showboat Fisher / Frank Gurney

Player statistics
Player	Team	Stat	Tot	Player	Team	Stat	Tot
Showboat Fisher	Miller	BA	.378	George Stueland	Sioux Falls	W	22
G.M. Hollocher	Mitchell	Hits	121	George Stueland	Sioux Falls	SO	212
				Lefty Wilkus	Mitchell	Pct	.778; 14–4

=== 1921 Dakota League ===
Team standings	W	L	PCT	GB	Managers
Mitchell Kernels	65	33	.590	–	Hank Scharnweber
Sioux Falls Soos	61	35	.649	3	Fred Carisch
Wahpeton–Breckenridge Twins	55	43	.561	10	Roy Patterson
Redfield Red Sox	47	46	.505	15½	Harry Halstead
Madison Greys	45	50	.474	18½	Dave Altizer
Watertown Cubs	44	53	.454	20½	Mattie McGrath
Aberdeen Grays	35	62	.361	29½	Ed Karger
Huron Packers	34	64	.347	31	Jay Andrews

Player statistics
Player	Team	Stat	Tot	Player	Team	Stat	Tot
Albert Nolt	Mitchell	BA	.395	George Stueland	Sioux Falls	W	22
Albert Nolt	Mitchell	Runs	121	George Stueland	Sioux Falls	SO	169
Albert Nolt	Mitchell	Hits	154	Earl Keiser	Mitchell	Pct	.909; 20–2
Albert Wenz	Madison	HR	9				

=== 1922 Dakota League ===
Team standings	W	L	PCT	GB	Managers
Mitchell Kernels	60	37	.619	–	Hank Scharnweber
Aberdeen Grays	56	42	.571	4½	E.H. Harkin / Bill Shipke
Fargo Athletics	56	42	.571	4½	Ed Whiting
Sioux City Soos	55	42	.567	5	Fred Carisch
Jamestown Jimkotans	46	51	.474	14	Wib Smith
Watertown Cubs	42	54	.443	17	John Mokate
Wahpeton–Breckenridge Twins	42	55	.439	18	Roy Patterson
Valley City Hi-Liners / Bismarck Capitals	30	64	.319	28½	Charlie Boardman / Ernie Menne / J. Sampson / Louis Bachant

Valley City (25–46) moved to Bismarck August 3.

Player statistics
Player	Team	Stat	Tot	Player	Team	Stat	Tot
Stan Lewan	Watertown	BA	.394	Cecil Duff	Mitchell	W	15
Lyman Nason	Wahpet/Breck	Runs	92	Ed Lane	Wahpet/Breck	W	15
Al Simmons	Aberdeen	Hits	144	Roy Birkenstock	Jamestown	SO	160
Lyman Nason	Wahpet/Breck	HR	17	Al Zweifel	Mitchell	Pct	.824; 14–3

=== 1923 South Dakota League / North Dakota League ===
South Dakota League standings	W	L	PCT	GB	Managers
Sioux Falls Soos	35	22	.614	–	Jack Beaty
Aberdeen Grays	35	23	.603	½	Nig Nolte
Mitchell Kernels	28	27	.5096	6	Hank Scharnweber
Watertown Cubs	15	41	.268	19½	Wib Smith

North Dakota League standings	W	L	PCT	GB	Managers
Minot Magicians	48	21	.750	–	Herb Hester
Jamestown Jimkotas	32	35	.478	15	Ed Whiting / Henry Wingfield
New Rockford-Carrington Twins / Valley City Hi-Liners	30	38	.441	17½	Earl Pickering
Bismarck Capitals	26	42	.382	21½	Tom Shanley / Mo McKnight

New Rockford–Carrington moved to Valley City July 17.

South Dakota League player statistics
Player	Team	Stat	Tot	Player	Team	Stat	Tot
Frank Naleway	Sioux Falls	BA	.337	Frank Brindza	Aberdeen	W	10
Lyman Nason	Mitchell	Runs	50	William Ludolph	Sioux Falls	SO	77
Louis Benson	Aberdeen	Runs	50	William Ludolph	Sioux Falls	PCT	.769 10–3
John Hart	Mitchell	Hits	68				
Robert Lee	Mitchell	Hits	68				
Wesley Clemons	Aberdeen	HR	10				

North Dakota League player statistics
Player	Team	Stat	Tot
Harry Wingfield	Jamestown	BA	.402
Fred Gunther	Minot	Hits	88
Albert Chenoweth	Jamestown	Hits	88
George Coleman	Minot	Runs	72
Albert Wenz	Jamestown	HR	6
Henry Oliver	Minot	HR	6

== Notable alumni ==
- Jim Bottomley, (1920) Mitchell Kernels. Inducted, Baseball Hall of Fame (1974).
- Al Simmons, (1922) Aberdeen Greys. Inducted, Baseball Hall of Fame (1953)
