= Jamestown Jimmies (minor league baseball) =

American baseball team (1922–23, 1936–37)

- 1936–1937; (1922–1923, 1936–1937); Jamestown, North Dakota

Minor league affiliations
- Class: Class D (1922–1923, 1936–1937)
- League: Dakota League (1922); North Dakota League (1923); Northern League (1936–1937)

Major league affiliations
- Team: St. Louis Cardinals (1936)

Minor league titles
- Division titles (1): 1936

Team data
- Name: Jamestown Jimkotans (1922); Jamestown Jimkotas (1923); Jamestown Jimmies (1936–1937)
- Ballpark: McElroy Park (1922–1923); City Park (1936–1937)

The Jamestown Jimmies were a minor league baseball team based in Jamestown, North Dakota. Earlier Jamestown teams played as members of the Class D level Dakota League in 1922 and North Dakota League in 1923, with the Jimmies playing as members of the Northern League in 1936 and 1937. The 1936 Jamestown Jimmies were a St. Louis Cardinals minor league affiliate and won the league pennant. The Jimmies hosted minor league home games at City Park, after the "Jimkotans" and "Jimkotas" played at McElroy Park, in the same location.

== History ==
Minor league baseball began in Jamestown, North Dakota in 1922. The 1922 Jamestown Jimkotans became members of the eight–team Class D level Dakota League, replacing the Huron Packers franchise in the league. H.E. Ross established the Jamestown Jinkotas. The Jamestown newspaper held a naming contest and "Jimkotans" beat out "Fort Sewards" by five votes. Funds were raised for a grandstand for the ballpark.

The Jamestown Jimkotans ended their first season of minor league play with a record of 46–51, placing fifth in the Dakota League standings. Wib Smith was the Jamestown manager, as the Jimkotans finished 14.0 games behind the first place Mitchell Kernels in the final standings. Mark Koenig played for Jamestown in 1922 at age 17, hitting .253. His manager, Wib Smith had made the major leagues at the age of 17 with the St. Louis Browns and was important to Koenig's development. Koenig would eventually become a member of the New York Yankees' famed 1927 Murderers' Row lineup, where he hit second in the Yankees' lineup, directly in front of Babe Ruth.

The franchise continued play in 1923, joining a new league. To minimize travel, the Dakota League was divided into the South Dakota League and the North Dakota League in 1923 and each played with four teams, with the North Dakota League maintaining Class D Status. The Jamestown Jimkotas played as members of the 1923 North Dakota League, with Logan Powell of Jamestown serving as the North Dakota League president. The Jimkotas ended the season with a record of 32–35, placing second, finishing 15.0 games behind the first place Minot Magicians. Ed Whiting and Henry Wingfield served as managers, as Wingfield hit .402 to lead the North Dakota League in batting average. The North Dakota League permanently folded after the 1923 season ended prematurely in August.

In the 1930s, integrated semi–pro baseball thrived in the area and the integrated Jamestown Red Sox team played against other regional teams, with such names as Satchel Paige playing for the local teams.

In 1936, minor league baseball returned as the Jamestown Jimmies became members of the Class D level Northern League, playing as a minor league affiliate of the St. Louis Cardinals. The "Jimmies" moniker originated in Jamestown as the moniker for the local University of Jamestown athletic teams beginning in 1925. The 1936 Jimmies won the Northern League pennant. The team ended the 1936 season with a record of 73–50, placing first in the Northern League regular season under managers John Anderson, Ernie Olson and Rube Foster, finishing 4.0 games ahead of the second place Eau Claire Bears. In the 1936 Northern League playoffs, the Winnipeg Maroons defeated the Jimmies in seven games.

In their final season of minor league play, the 1937 Jamestown Jimmies placed fifth in the Northern League final standings. With a record of 49–65, Jamestown finished behind the first place Duluth Dukes, who also had become the league's St. Louis Cardinals affiliate. Edward Kraus served as Jamestown manager in 1937.

The Jamestown franchise folded from the Northern League after the completion of the 1937 season. Jamestown, North Dakota has not hosted another minor league team.

== The ballpark ==
Jamestown hosted minor league home games in McElroy Park, which contains Jack Brown Stadium, in 1922 and 1923. The McElroy Park ballpark was built in 1917 and was later renamed. Today, Jack Brown Stadium is home to University of Jamestown and Jamestown High School teams. The address is 1102 3rd Avenue SE, Jamestown, North Dakota.

In 1936 and 1937, the Jamestown Jimmies played home games at City Park. City Park and McElroy Park are the same location.

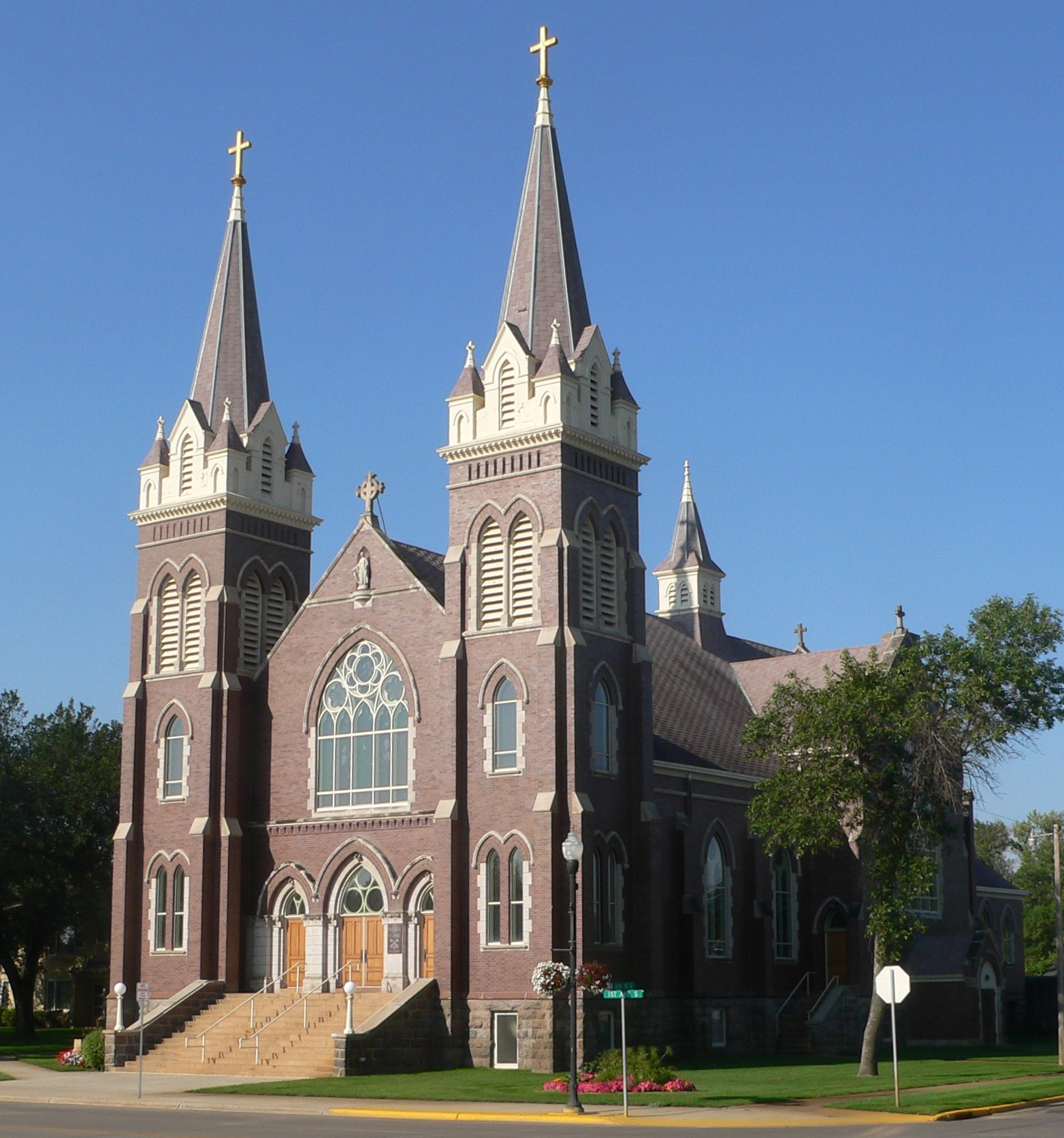
(2017) St. James Basilica. National Register of Historic Places. Jamestown, North Dakota

== Timeline ==
Year(s)	# Yrs.	Team	Level	League	Affiliate	Ballpark
1922	1	Jamestown Jimkotans	Class D	Dakota League	None	McElroy Park
1923	1	Jamestown Jimkotas	Class D	North Dakota League	None	McElroy Park
1936	1	Jamestown Jimmies	Class D	Northern League	St. Louis Cardinals	City Park
1937	1	Jamestown Jimmies	Class D	Northern League	None	City Park

== Year–by–year records ==
Year	Record	Finish	Manager	Playoffs/Notes
1922	46–51	5th	Wib Smith	No playoffs held
1923	32–35	2nd	Ed Whiting / Henry Wingfield	No playoffs held
1936	73–50	1st	John Anderson / Ernie Olson / Rube Foster	League pennant Lost in 1st round
1937	49–65	3rd	Edward Kraus	League folded in August

== Notable alumni ==
- Mark Koenig (1922)
- Dave Odom (1936)
- Wib Smith (1922, MGR)
- Ed Whiting (1923, MGR)
