= Miller Climbers =

- 1920; Miller, South Dakota

Minor league affiliations
- Class: Class D (1920)
- League: South Dakota League (1920)

Major league affiliations
- Team: None

Team data
- Name: Miller Climbers (1920)
- Ballpark: Crystal Park (1920)

The Miller Climbers were a minor league baseball team based in Miller, South Dakota. In 1920, Miller played as charter members of the Class D level South Dakota League, finishing in last place while hosting home minor league games at Crystal Park.

== History ==
In 1920, Miller, South Dakota first hosted minor league baseball when the "Miller Climbers" began play as charter members of the eight–team, Class D level South Dakota League. The Aberdeen Boosters, Huron Packers, Madison Greys, Mitchell Kernels, Redfield Reds, Sioux Falls Soos and Wessington Springs Saints teams joined Miller in beginning play as charter members of the South Dakota League. The Miller team was also referred to as the "Jugglers" in 1920.

The Miller Climbers finished in last place in the South Dakota League as the league folded during the season. Miller ended the 1920 season with a record of 30–64, playing under managers Showboat Fisher and Frank Gurney and ending the season in eighth place. The South Dakota league disbanded on July 17, 1920. Miller finished 29.0 games behind the Mitchell Kernels in the final standings and were 10.0 games behind the seventh place Aberdeen Boosters. After the South Dakota league disbanded on July 17, the league changed names to the Dakota League and resumed play during the season, but Miller did not field a franchise.

The Miller franchise permanently folded after the 1920 season. Miller has not hosted another minor league team.

== The ballpark ==
The Miller Climbers hosted home minor league games at Crystal Park. The 20-acre park is still in use today as a public park. Crystal Park is located at West 7th Street & West 2nd Avenue in Miller, South Dakota.

== Year-by-year record ==
| Year | Record | Finish | Manager | Playoffs/Notes |
|---|---|---|---|---|
| 1920 | 30–64 | 8th | Red Fisher / Frank Gurney | League disbanded July 17 |

== Notable alumni ==
- Showboat Fisher (1920, player/MGR)
