= Madison Greys =

- 1920–1921; Madison, South Dakota

Minor league affiliations
- Class: Class D (1920–1921)
- League: South Dakota League (1920) Dakota League (1921)

Major league affiliations
- Team: None

Minor league titles
- League titles (0): None

Team data
- Name: Madison Greys (1920–1921)
- Ballpark: Baughman Park (1920–1921)

The Madison Greys were a minor league baseball team based in Madison, South Dakota. In 1920 and 1921, the Greys played as members of the 1920 Class D level South Dakota League in 1920 and its successor, the 1921 Dakota League, while hosting home games at Baughman Park.

== History ==
In 1920, Madison, South Dakota first hosted minor league baseball when the "Madison Greys" began play as charter members of the Class D level South Dakota League. In the eight–team league, the charter franchises joining Madison were the Aberdeen Boosters, Huron Packers, Miller Climbers, Mitchell Kernels, Redfield Reds, Sioux Falls Soos and Wessington Springs Saints.

In their first season of play, the Madison Greys finished in sixth place in the South Dakota League as the league folded during the season. Madison ended the 1920 season with a record of 42–50, playing under managers Ralph Works and Dave Altizer. The South Dakota league disbanded on July 17, 1920. The Saints finished 16.5 games behind the first place Mitchell Kernels in the final standings.

In 1921, Madison continued play as the league changed names to the Dakota League, reforming after adding the Wahpeton-Breckenridge Twins, based in North Dakota and Minnesota. Madison finished in fifth place in the standings. The Dakota league remained an eight–team Class D level league, with 13–player rosters. Joining the Madison Greys as 1921 league members were the Aberdeen Grays, Huron Packers, Mitchell Kernels, Redfield Red Sox, Sioux Falls Soos, Wahpeton-Breckenridge Twins and Watertown Cubs. The Mitchell Kernels won their second consecutive league championship, with Madison finishing 18.5 games behind. The Greys finished with a 45–50 record under returning manager Dave Altizer.

The Madison franchise did not return to play in the 1922 Dakota League. Madison has not hosted another minor league team.

== The ballpark ==
The Madison Greys teams hosted their 1920 and 1921 minor league home games at Baughman Park. Today, Baughman Park is still in use as a public park, located at 1010 Northeast 1st Street in Madison, South Dakota.

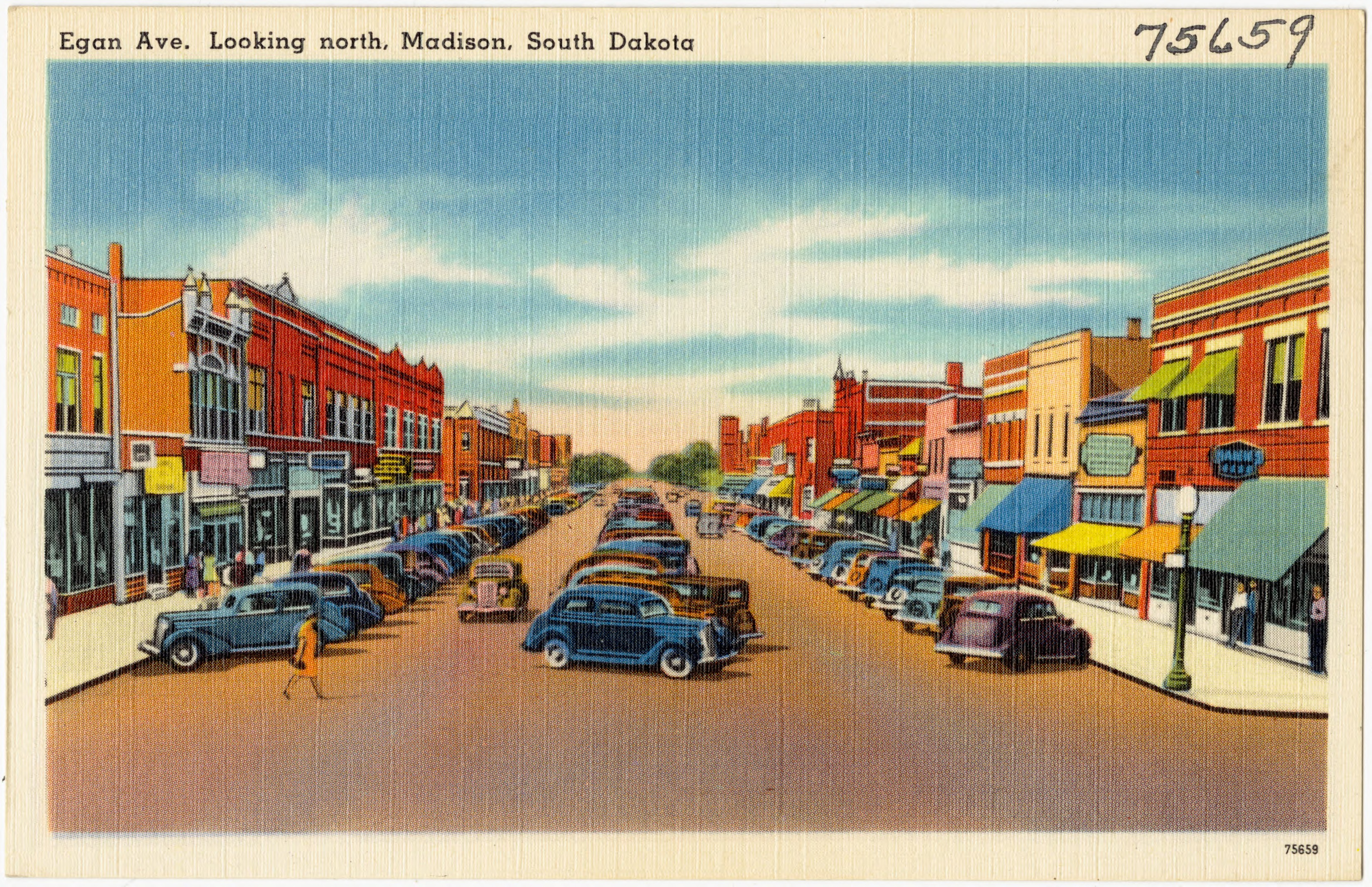
(1930) Egan Avenue. Madison, South Dakota.

== Timeline ==
Year(s)	# Yrs.	Team	Level	League	Ballpark
1920	1	Madison Greys	Class D	South Dakota League	Baughman Park
1921	1	Madison Greys	Class D	Dakota League	Baughman Park

== Year–by–year records ==
Year	Record	Finish	Manager	Playoffs/Notes
1920	42–50	6th	Ralph Works / Dave Altizer	League disbanded July 17
1921	45–50	5th	Dave Altizer	No playoffs held

== Notable alumni ==
- Dave Altizer (1920–1921, MGR)
- Nick Cullop (1920)
- George Pipgras (1921)

== See also ==
Madison Greys players
