= Redfield Reds =

- 1920–1921; Redfield, South Dakota

Minor league affiliations
- Class: Class D (1920–1921)
- League: South Dakota League (1920); Dakota League (1921)

Major league affiliations
- Team: None

Minor league titles
- League titles (0): None
- Conference titles (0): None

Team data
- Name: Redfield Reds (1920–1921)
- Ballpark: College Park (1920–1921); Armandale Park (1920–1921)

The Redfield Reds were a minor league baseball team based in Redfield, South Dakota. In 1920 and 1921, the Reds played as members of the South Dakota League in 1920 and Dakota League in 1921.

Redfield hosted home minor league games at College Park, also playing select Sunday games at Armandale Park.

== History ==
In 1920, Redfield "Reds" began minor league play as members of the South Dakota League, which formed as an eight–team Class D level league, with all franchises based in South Dakota. The league was the first professional baseball in South Dakota since a Sioux Falls team had played in the 1902–1903 Iowa-South Dakota League. Joining Redfield in the 1920 South Dakota League as charter franchises were the Aberdeen Boosters, Huron Packers, Madison Greys, Miller Climbers, Mitchell Kernels, Sioux Falls Soos and Wessington Springs Saints teams.

In their first season of play, the 1920 Redfield Reds finished in fifth place in the South Dakota League. Playing under managers Ollie Pickering and Harry Halstead, Redfield finished 14.0 games behind the first place Mitchell Kernels, who won their first of three consecutive championships. Redfield had a 46–49 record.

In 1921, the Redfield Reds continued play as the league changed names to the Dakota League, renaming after adding the Wahpeton-Breckenridge Twins, based in North Dakota and Minnesota. Baseball play on Sunday had been illegal in North Dakota until the law was repealed in 1920, a positive for early professional teams, who needed the revenue from large Sunday crowds to remain financially viable. The Dakota league remained an eight–team Class D level league, with 13–player rosters. The 1921 league members joining Redfield in Dakota League play were the Aberdeen Grays, Huron Packers, Madison Greys, Mitchell Kernels, Sioux Falls Soos, Wahpeton-Breckenridge Twins and Watertown Cubs.

In their final season of play, the Redfield Reds placed fourth in the 1921 Dakota League final standings. Redfield ended the season with a 47–46 record, playing under managers Henry Wingfield and Harry Halstead and finished 15½ games behind the first place Mitchell Kernels in the league standings.

Redfield folded following the 1921 season and did not return to the 1922 Dakota League. Redfield, South Dakota has not hosted another minor league team.

== The ballparks ==
The Redfield Reds were noted to have played home games at College Park. The ballpark was located at 502 East 2nd Street in Redfield, South Dakota, at the site of the former Redfield College, which also offered high school courses and closed in 1932.

Redfield was referenced to have played select Sunday minor league home games at Armandale Park. Still in use today as a public park, the ballpark was located at 391st Avenue & 151st Street in Mellette, South Dakota.

== Timeline ==
Year(s)	# Yrs.	Team	Level	League	Ballpark(s)
1921	1	Redfield Reds	Class D	South Dakota League	College Park; Armandale Park
1922	1	Redfield Reds	Class D	Dakota League	College Park; Armandale Park

== Year–by–year records ==
Year	Record	Finish	Manager	Playoffs/notes
1920	46–49	5th	Ollie Pickering / Harry Halstead	No playoffs held
1921	47–46	4th	Henry Wingfield / Harry Halstead	No playoffs held

== Notable alumni ==
- Harry LaRoss (1921)
- Ollie Pickering (1920, MGR)
- Redfield Reds players
