= Watertown Expos =

Minor league baseball team in Watertown, South Dakota

- 1970–1971; Watertown, South Dakota

Minor league affiliations
- Class: Class A-Short Season (1971–1972)
- League: Northern League (1971–1972)

Major league affiliations
- Team: Montreal Expos (1971–1972)

Minor league titles
- League titles (0): None

Team data
- Name: Watertown Expos (1971–1972)
- Ballpark: Watertown Stadium (1971–1972)

The Watertown Expos were an American professional minor league baseball team that existed from 1970 to 1971 in Watertown, South Dakota, playing two seasons in the Northern League at historic Watertown Stadium.

The Watertown Expos were a minor league affiliate of the Montreal Expos in both their seasons of play.

== History ==
The Expos were preceded by the Watertown Cubs, who played as members of the Class D level Dakota League in 1921 and 1922 and South Dakota League in 1923; and also by the Watertown Lake Sox, who played in the collegiate summer Basin League from 1954 to 1962.

The Watertown Expos previously played as the Winnipeg Goldeyes in 1969, but were purchased and moved by the Montreal Expos to Watertown when Montreal moved their AAA affiliate, the Buffalo Bisons, to Winnipeg. Watertown's first game as members of the Class A level Northern League came only two weeks after the team was established there.

The Watertown Expos were minor league affiliates of the Montreal Expos and adopted the corresponding moniker. When the Northern League folded after the 1971 season, the four remaining teams were the Aberdeen Pheasants, Sioux Falls Packers, St. Cloud Rox, and Watertown Expos.

The Watertown Expos finished in 4th place in both their seasons of play. In 1970, the team ended the season with a record of 32–38, finishing 16.5 games behind the 1st place Duluth-Superior Dukes, playing under manager Bobby Malkmus in the six–team league. In 1971, Watertown ended the 1971 season with a 30–40 record under manager Bob Oldis. In their final season of play, Watertown finished 12.0 games behind the 1st place St. Cloud Rox in the four–team league.

Watertown, South Dakota has not hosted another minor league team.

== The ballpark ==
The Watertown minor league teams were noted to have played home games at Watertown Stadium. The ballpark is located at 1600 West Kemp Avenue, Watertown, South Dakota. Still in use today, the ballpark, constructed in 1940, is on the National Register of Historic Places.

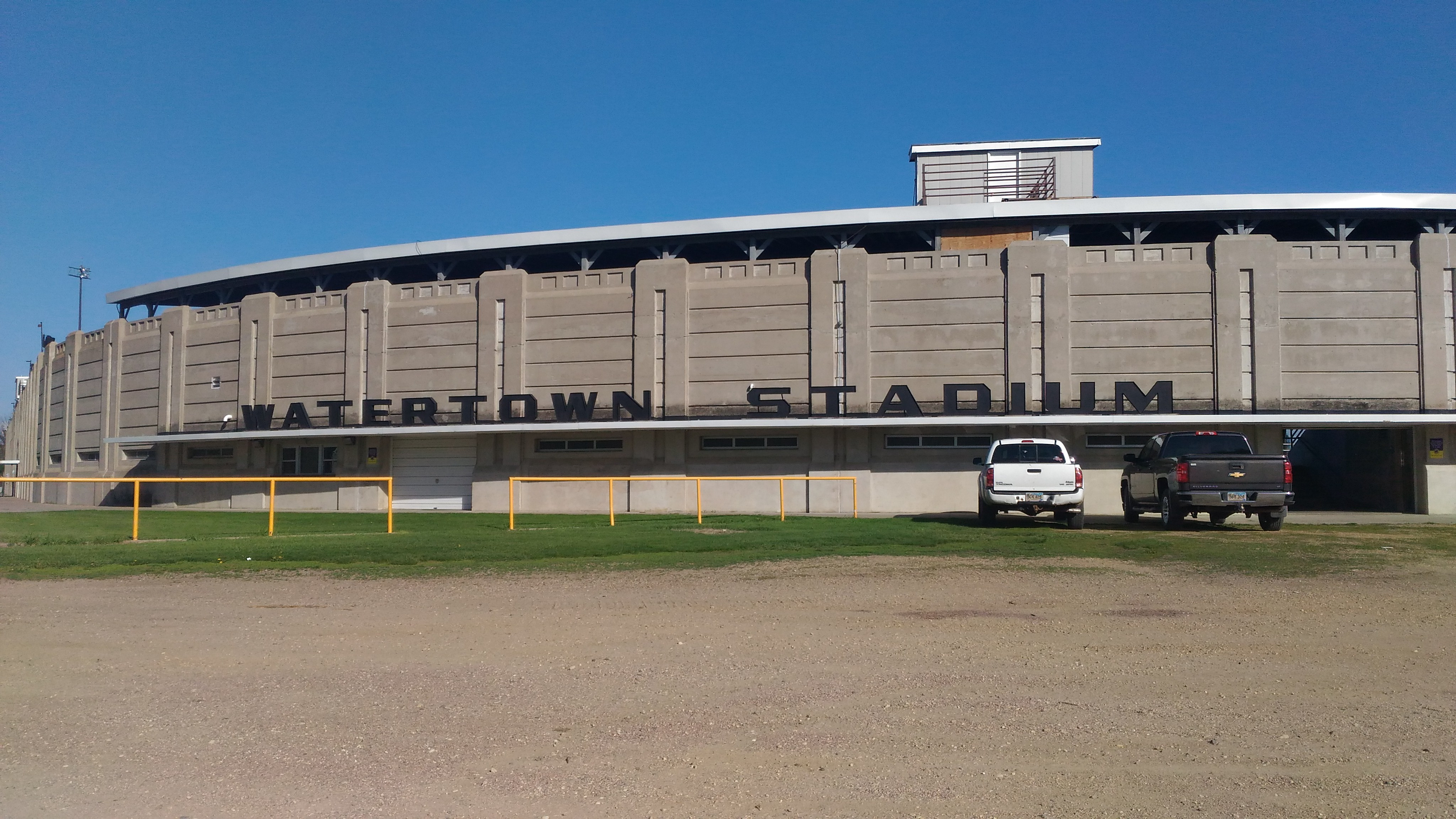
Watertown Stadium, May 2017

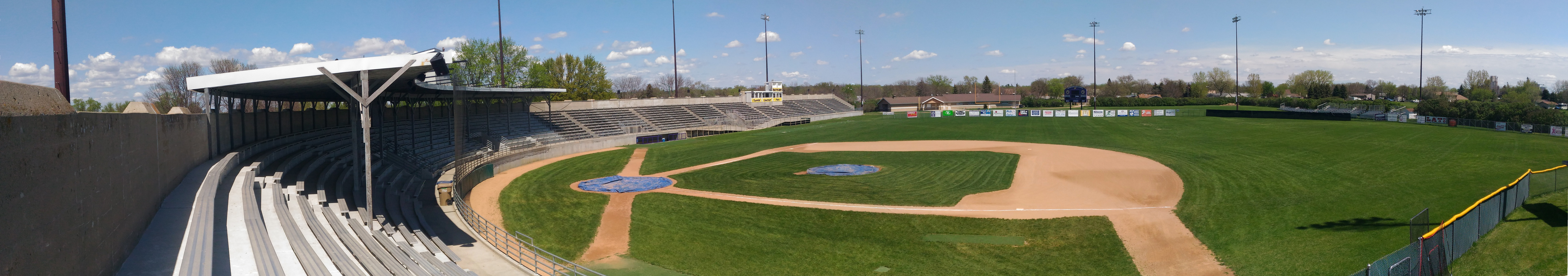
Watertown Stadium stands and field, May 2017

== Timeline ==
Year(s)	# Yrs.	Team	Level	League	Affiliate
1921–1922	2	Watertown Cubs	Class D	Dakota League	None
1923	1	Watertown Cubs	Class D	South Dakota League	None
1954–1962	9	Watertown Lake Sox	Summer collegiate baseball	Basin League	None
1971–1972	2	Watertown Expos	Class A Short Season	Northern League	Montreal Expos

== Year–by–year records ==
Year	Record	Finish	Manager	Playoffs
1970	32–38	4th	Bobby Malkmus	None held
1971	30–40	4th	Bob Oldis	None held

== Notable alumni ==
- Don Hopkins (1971)
- Larry Lintz (1971)
- Bobby Malkmus (1970, MGR)
- Dale Murray (1970)
- Bob Oldis (1971, MGR)
- Pat Scanlon (1970)
- Tony Scott (1970)
- Dan Warthen (1971)

=== See also ===
Watertown Expos players
