= Wessington Springs Saints =

- 1920; Wessington Springs, South Dakota

Minor league affiliations
- Class: Class D (1920)
- League: South Dakota League (1920)

Major league affiliations
- Team: None

Minor league titles
- League titles (0): None

Team data
- Name: Wessington Springs Saints (1920)
- Ballpark: Wessington Springs City Park (1920)

The Wessington Springs Saints were a minor league baseball team based in Wessington Springs, South Dakota. In 1920, the Saints briefly played as members of the Class D level South Dakota League, hosting home minor league games at the Wessington Springs City Park.

== History ==
In 1920, Wessington Springs, South Dakota first hosted minor league baseball when the "Wessington Springs Saints" began play as charter members of the eight–team, Class D level South Dakota League. The Aberdeen Boosters, Huron Packers, Madison Greys, Miller Climbers, Mitchell Kernels, Redfield Reds and Sioux Falls Soos teams joined Wessington in beginning league play on May 18, 1920.

The "Saints" nickname corresponds to Wessington being home to the Wessington Springs College/Seminary in the era. Opened in 1887, the college closed in 1964.

The Wessington Springs Saints finished in fourth place in the 1920 South Dakota League, before the league reorganized during the season. The South Dakota league disbanded on July 17, 1920, and changed names to the Dakota League, but Wessington Springs did not field a franchise. Wessington Springs ended the 1920 season with a record of 49–48, as Matt McGrath served as manager. The Saints finished 12.0 games behind the first place Mitchell Kernels in the final standings.

The 1920 Saints were the final minor league team hosted in Wessington Springs.

== The ballpark ==
The Wessington Springs Saints played minor league home games at Wessington Springs City Park. Still in use as a public park, Wessington Springs City Park is located on Dakota Avenue South, Wessington Springs, South Dakota.

== Year–by–year record ==
Year	Record	Finish	Manager	Playoffs
1920	49–48	4th	Matt McGrath	No playoffs held

== Notable alumni ==
No Wessington Springs Saints alumni reached the major leagues.
