= Wahpeton–Breckenridge Methodists =

- 1897; Wahpeton, North Dakota

Minor league affiliations
- Class: Class F (1897)
- League: Red River Valley League (1897)

Major league affiliations
- Team: None

Minor league titles
- League titles (0): None

Team data
- Name: Wahpeton–Breckenridge Methodists (1897)
- Ballpark: Unknown (1897)

The Wahpeton–Breckenridge Methodists were a minor league baseball team based in Wahpeton, North Dakota in partnership with Breckenridge, Minnesota. In 1897, the Methodists played as members of the Class F level Red River Valley League in their only season of play, preceding the 1921 Wahpeton-Breckenridge Twins.

== History ==
The Wahpeton–Breckenridge Methodists were charter members of the 1897 Red River Valley League. The league began minor league baseball play as a four–team, Class F level league. The Methodists joined the Fargo Divorcees, Grand Forks Senators and Moorhead Barmaids in beginning league play on May 26, 1897. Player salaries were capped at $40.00 per month by the league.

The Wahpeton–Breckenridge Methodists were owned by a group of local businessmen headed by Claude Rittenhouse, who was an area druggist.

The Red River Valley League permanently disbanded on August 8, 1897, eight days after the first–half of the season had ended.

Methodist player Jimmy Hart had a violent altercation with an umpire during the season, knocking umpire Lyons to the ground and "bruising him badly" following a game against Fargo.

When the Red River Valley League folded on August 8, 1897, the Wahpeton–Breckenridge Methodists were in third place, 12.0 games behind the Moorhead Barmaids. Moorhead ended the season in first place in the league standings with a 32–13 record. Moorhead was 10.5 games ahead of the second place Grand Forks Senators (19–21), followed by the Wahpeton–Breckenridge Methodists (16–21) and Fargo Divorcees (17–29).

The two cities resumed minor league play in 1921, when the Wahpeton-Breckenridge Twins began play as members of the Class D level Dakota League.

== The ballpark ==
The name and location of the home minor league ballpark for the Wahpeton–Breckenridge Methodists is unknown.

On June 10, 1897, the Ringling Brothers Circus was setting up for a performance in Wahpeton when a lightning strike killed three workers.

== Year–by–year record ==
Year	Record	Finish	Manager	Playoffs/notes
1897	16–21	3rd	Ted Corbett	League folded August 8

== Notable alumni ==
- Jimmy Hart (1897)

== See also ==
- Wahpeton–Breckenridge Twins
