= Warren Wanderers =

American baseball team (1917–1917)

- 1917; Warren, Minnesota

Minor league affiliations
- Class: Class C (1917)
- League: Northern League (1917)

Major league affiliations
- Team: None

Minor league titles
- League titles (0): None

Team data
- Name: Warren Wanderers (1917)
- Ballpark: Unknown (1917)

The Warren Wanderers were a minor league baseball team based in Warren, Minnesota. In 1917, the Wanderers played as members of the Class C level Northern League, finishing in fourth place in their only season of play.

== History ==
Warren, Minnesota first hosted minor league baseball in 1917. The Warren Wanderers became members of the four–team Class C level Northern League. The Fargo-Moorhead Graingrowers, Minot Why Nots and Winnipeg Maroons teams joined Warren in league play.

Playing as a four–team league in 1917, the Northern League had decreased from playing as a six–team league in 1916 and an eight–team league in 1915.The start of World War I was a factor. Warren and Minot were new franchises in the league.

After beginning play on May 10, 1917, the Warren Wanderers finished last in the Northern League standings. The Northern League folded on July 4, 1917, due to World War I. With a record of 16–30, the team finished in fourth place, playing under manager Frank Withrow. Warren finished 16.0 games behind the first place Fargo-Moorhead Graingrowers in the final standings. The Fargo-Moorhead Graingrowers (36–16), Winnipeg Maroons (24–26) and Minot Why Nots (19–23) finished ahead of Warren in the final standings.

The Northern League resumed play in 1933 without a Warren franchise. Warren, Minnesota has not hosted another minor league team.

== The ballpark ==
The name of the home ballpark for the Warren Wanderers is unknown.

== Year-by-year record ==
Year	Record	Finish	Manager	Playoffs/Notes
1917	16–30	4th	Frank Withrow	No playoffs held

== Notable alumni ==
- Frank Withrow (1917, MGR)
