= Larry Lintz =

American baseball player (born 1949)

- Infielder
- Born: October 10, 1949 (age 76); Martinez, California, U.S.
- Batted: Switch Threw: Right

MLB debut
- July 14, 1973, for the Montreal Expos

Last MLB appearance
- May 30, 1978, for the Cleveland Indians

MLB statistics
- Batting average: .227
- Runs batted in: 27
- Stolen bases: 128
- Stats at Baseball Reference

Teams
- Montreal Expos (1973–1975); St. Louis Cardinals (1975); Oakland Athletics (1976–1977); Cleveland Indians (1978)

Larry Lintz (born October 10, 1949) is an American former professional baseball player whose career extended from 1971 to 1979 and included Major League service with the Montreal Expos (1973–1975), St. Louis Cardinals (1975), Oakland Athletics (1976–1977) and Cleveland Indians (1978). Primarily a second baseman, Lintz stood 5 feet 9 inches (1.75 m) tall and weighed 150 pounds (68 kg). He was a switch-hitter who threw right-handed. In six Major League seasons, Lintz played in 350 games and had 137 runs, 140 hits, and 128 stolen bases.

== Career ==
Lintz signed with the Expos after being selected out of San Jose State University in the sixth round of the 1971 Major League Baseball draft. He began his career with the Watertown Expos that year, finishing with a .280 batting average in 65 games. In 1972, he spent the season with the Quebec Carnavals. In 131 games, he recorded 96 stolen bases in 107 attempts, which was an Eastern League record. After spending part of 1973 with the Peninsula Whips, the Expos promoted him to the major league roster.

Lintz made his debut on July 14, 1973, and played in 52 games. In the following season, he played in 113 games, finishing the year with a .238 batting average and 50 stolen bases, which was fifth in the National League. After 46 games with the Expos in 1975, he was traded to the St. Louis Cardinals for Jim Dwyer, and finished the season with them; after the season ended he was traded to the Oakland Athletics for Charlie Chant. In 1976, Lintz was used almost exclusively by the Athletics as a pinch-runner, appearing in 68 games with only one at-bat; during that season he scored 21 runs and stole 31 bases in 42 attempts.

After spending 1977 with the Athletics, Lintz signed with the Cleveland Indians. He played in three games to end his major league career, and spent most of the season with the minor league Portland Beavers. He played in three games for the Tacoma Tugs, the following season, then retired.

Lintz was the inspiration for a character in the award-winning short film "Darwin's Tears."
