= Ollie Pickering =

American baseball player and manager (1870–1952)

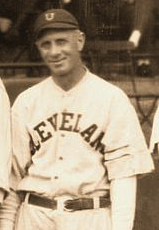
- Pickering in 1921
- Center fielder
- Born: April 9, 1870; Olney, Illinois, U.S.
- Died: January 20, 1952 (aged 81); Vincennes, Indiana, U.S.
- Batted: Left Threw: Right

MLB debut
- August 9, 1896, for the Louisville Colonels

Last MLB appearance
- October 8, 1908, for the Washington Senators

MLB statistics
- Batting average: .271
- Home runs: 9
- Runs batted in: 287
- Stats at Baseball Reference

Teams
- Louisville Colonels (1896–1897); Cleveland Spiders (1897); Cleveland Blues/Bronchos (1901–1902); Philadelphia Athletics (1903–1904); St. Louis Browns (1907); Washington Senators (1908)

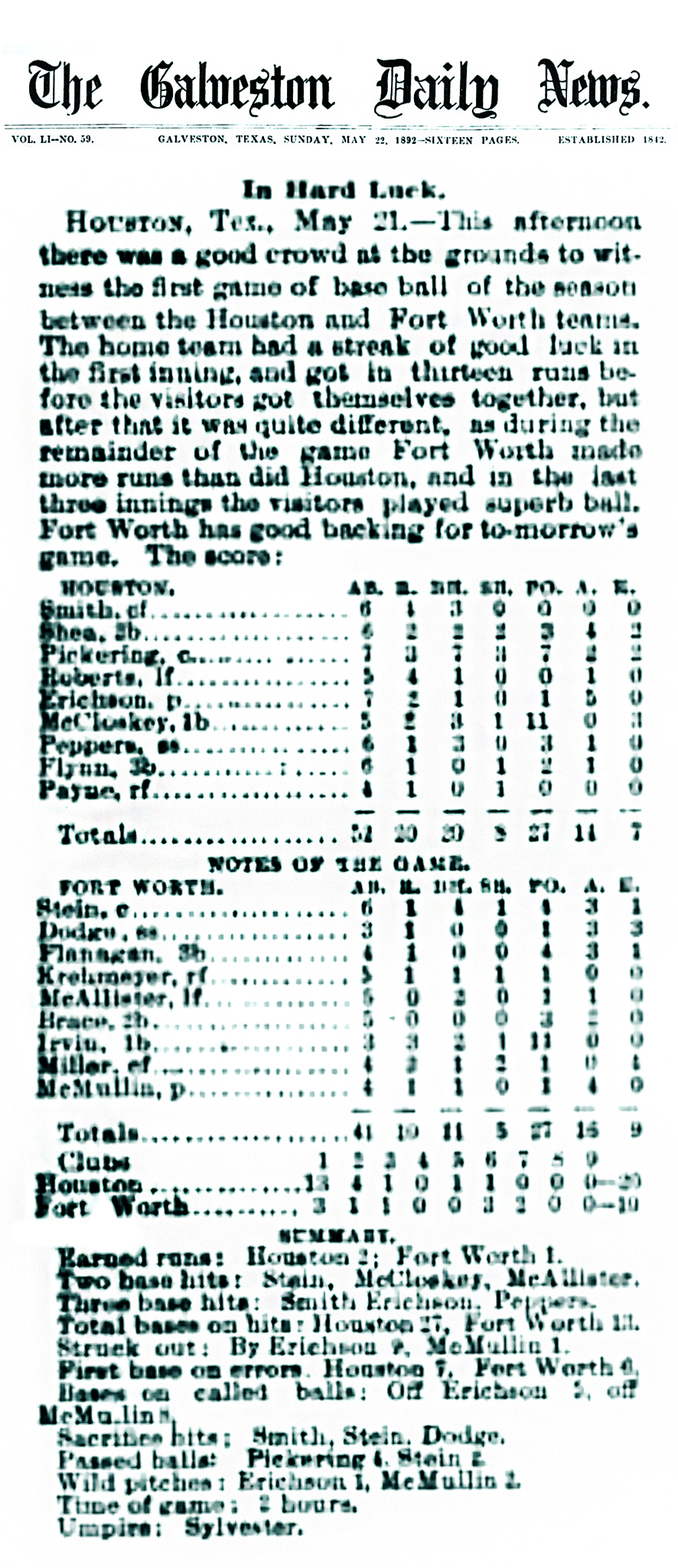
The recap and box score from the May 21, 1892, game in which Pickering went 7-for-7, all flares, giving rise to the term "Texas Leaguer".

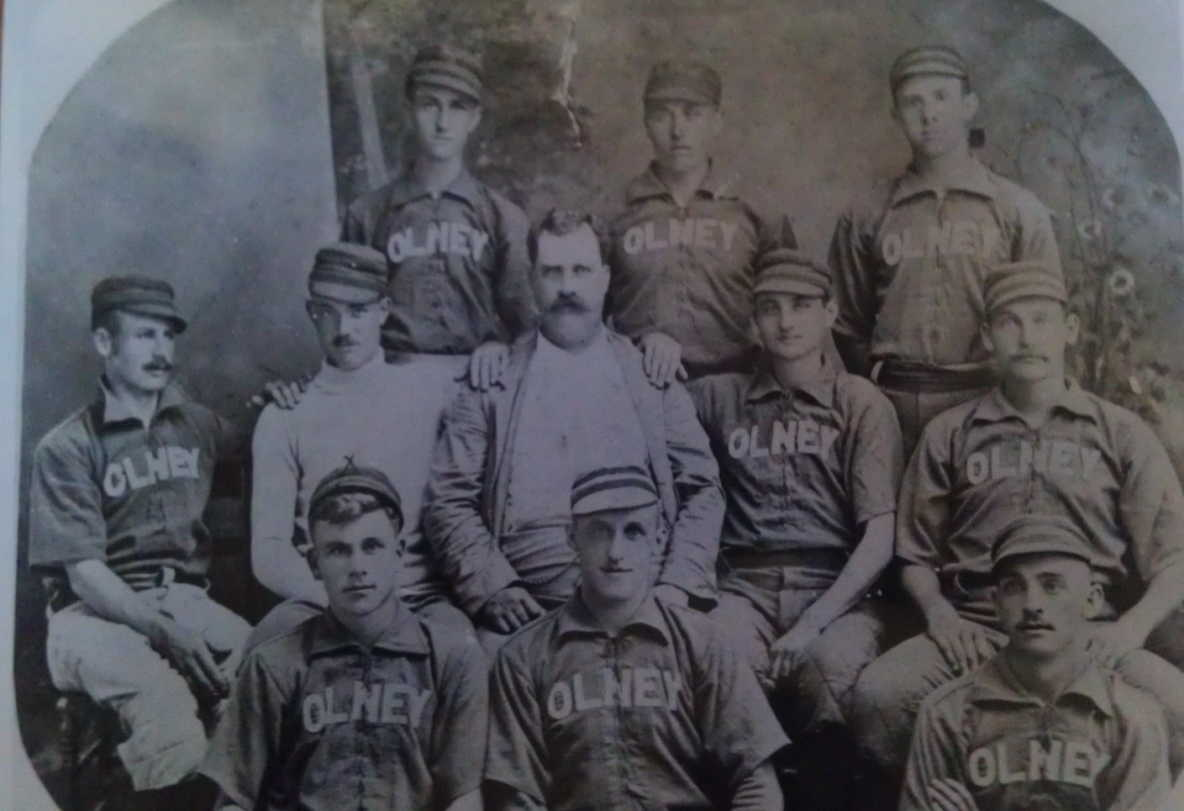
Pickering (top row, far right) in 1893, with his hometown Olney, IL, baseball team.

Oliver Daniel Pickering (April 9, 1870 – January 20, 1952) was an American professional baseball outfielder and manager in a 30-year career that spanned from the 1892 Houston Mudcats to the 1922 Paducah Indians. He played for a number of Major League Baseball teams from 1896 to 1908: the Louisville Colonels, Cleveland Spiders, Cleveland Blues, Philadelphia Athletics, St. Louis Browns, and Washington Senators.

== Career ==
Pickering is credited with giving baseball the term "Texas leaguer", a pejorative slang for a weak pop fly that lands unimpressively between an infielder and an outfielder for a base hit. According to the April 21, 1906, edition of The Sporting Life, John McCloskey, founder of the Texas League and then-manager of the Houston Mudcats – who would later go onto manage the St. Louis Cardinals – signed 22-year-old Pickering to play center field on the morning of May 21, 1892. That afternoon, Pickering turned in one of the most remarkable performances in the history of the Texas League, stringing together seven consecutive singles in one game, each a soft, looping fly ball that fell in no-man's land between either the first baseman and right fielder or the third baseman and left fielder. News of Pickering's feat spread quickly throughout the nation, and the term "Texas leaguer" became ingrained in the baseball lexicon. Pickering's seven consecutive singles in a game still stands as a Texas League record.

On April 24, 1901, Pickering was the leadoff batter for the Cleveland Blues (precursor to the Indians), which was the visiting team facing the Chicago White Sox in the first game ever played in the American League. The three other games scheduled that day were rained out. Thus, Pickering was the first person to bat in the American League. According to The Cleveland Indians Encyclopedia, based on an account from the Cleveland Plains-Dealer, this transpired: "The date was April 24, in Chicago's White Sox park (a.k.a. South Side Park), when Ollie Pickering stepped to the plate for the Cleveland Blues. Pickering, an outfielder, hit the second pitch from Chicago White Sox right-hander Roy Patterson to center field. William Hoy, a deaf-mute who was cruelly nicknamed Dummy, caught the routine fly, and with that the American League was officially underway." Chicago went on to win, 8–2.

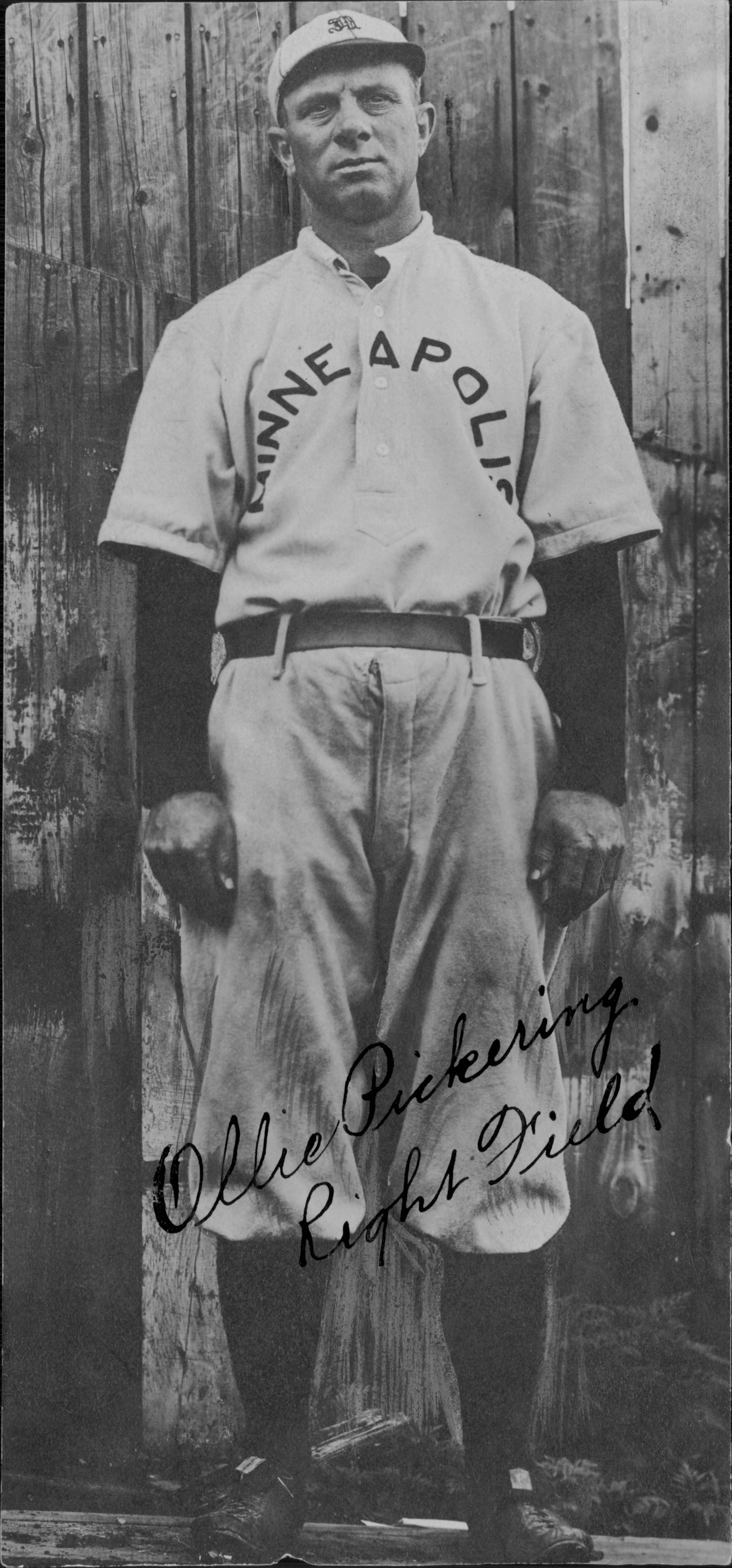
Ollie Pickering, 1909.

On May 5, 1904, Pickering, playing for the Philadelphia Athletics, twice came close to spoiling Cy Young's perfect game for the Boston Americans, the first ever thrown in the American League. Of Pickering's performance, author Michael Coffey wrote: "In the fourth ... Ollie Pickering looped one into the no-man's land beyond the second-base bag – in a bid for the kind of hit he made famous – only to have center fielder Chick Stahl make a fine running catch. Pickering was almost the spoiler again, with one down in the top of the sixth, when he tapped a slow roller to short, but Freddy Parent charged the ball and nipped Pickering by half a step."

Pickering played and managed in the minor leagues into his 50s. His playing days ended in 1920 at the age of 50 with the Redfield Reds. He last managed with the Paducah Indians in 1922. Upon his retirement from the game, Pickering became an umpire and later retired in Vincennes, Indiana.

Pickering's great-great-grandson is National Football League side judge Jimmy Russell.
