= Dan Warthen =

American baseball player and coach (born 1952)

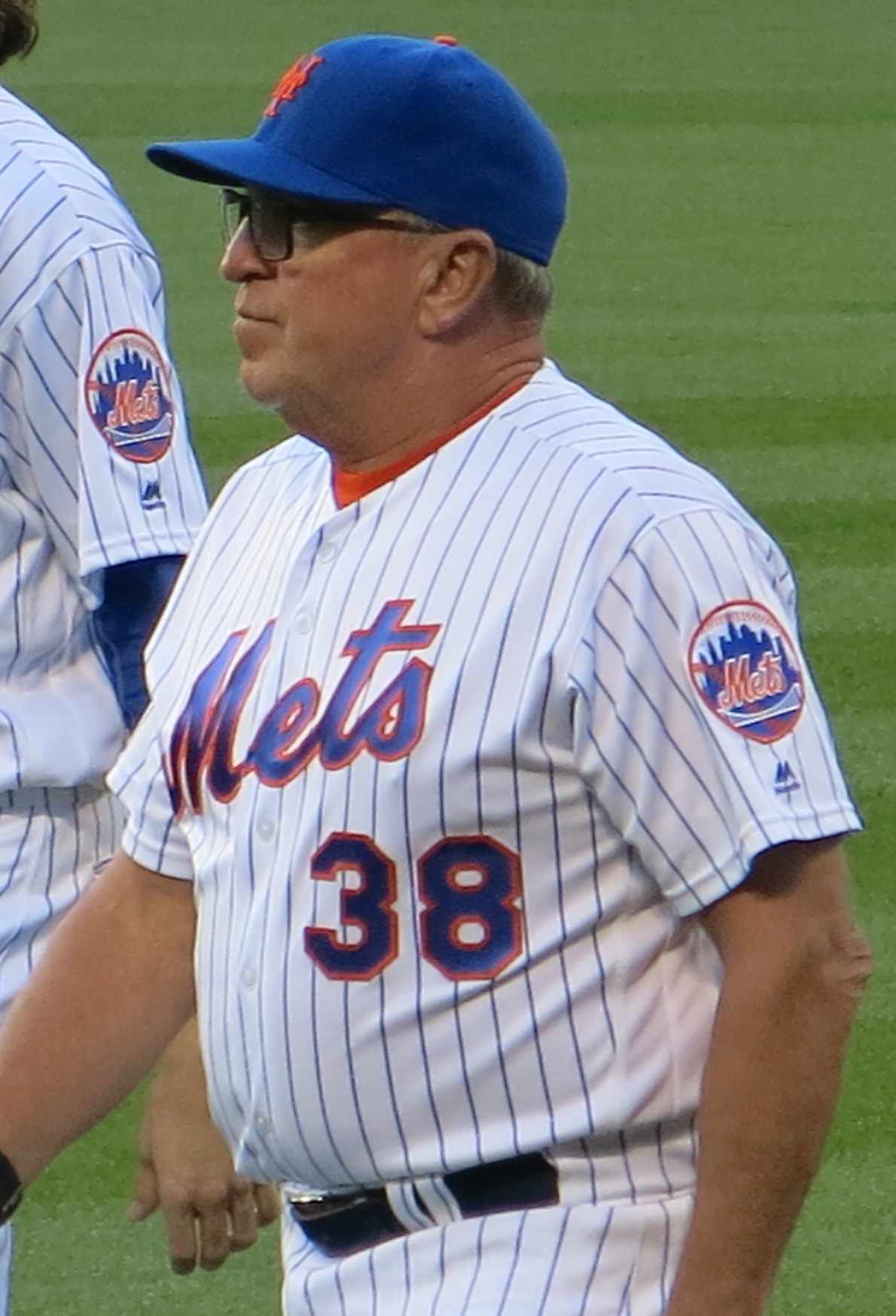
- Warthen with the Mets in 2016
- Pitcher
- Born: December 1, 1952 (age 73); Omaha, Nebraska, U.S.
- Batted: Switch Threw: Left

MLB debut
- May 18, 1975, for the Montreal Expos

Last MLB appearance
- September 29, 1978, for the Houston Astros

MLB statistics
- Win–loss record: 12–21
- Earned run average: 4.31
- Strikeouts: 224
- Stats at Baseball Reference

Teams
- As player: Montreal Expos (1975–1977); Philadelphia Phillies (1977); Houston Astros (1978); As coach: Seattle Mariners (1991–1992); San Diego Padres (1996–1997); Detroit Tigers (1999–2002); Los Angeles Dodgers (2006–2007); New York Mets (2008–2017); Texas Rangers (2018)

Daniel Dean Warthen (born December 1, 1952) is an American former professional baseball player and coach. He played in Major League Baseball (MLB) as a left-handed pitcher from 1975 to 1978 for the Montreal Expos, Philadelphia Phillies, and the Houston Astros. He was a pitching coach for four MLB teams, including with the New York Mets from mid-2008 to 2017.

== Early life ==
Warthen was born in Omaha, Nebraska and attended Omaha North High School, graduating in 1971. He was a high school All-American quarterback, tight end, and linebacker in football and also a star in baseball. He was the 1971 co-winner of the B'nai B'rith Award. In 2018, he was inducted into the Omaha Public Schools Athletic Hall of Fame.

== Playing career ==
Warthen was drafted by the Montreal Expos in the second round of the 1971 Major League Baseball draft. He pitched first for the Watertown Expos in the 1971 Northern League, and was 9–3 with a 3.96 ERA, leading the league with 10 complete games and second in the league in wins.

He made his MLB debut as a 22-year-old with the Expos on May 18, 1975, pitching a scoreless eighth inning against the Cincinnati Reds. In his rookie season in 1975, Warthen was 8–6 with three saves and a 3.11 ERA in 167 2/3 innings over 40 games (18 starts), and had the fourth most strikeouts per nine innings (6.871) and third fewest hits per nine innings (6.978) in the National League. Warthen later said that he hurt his arm during a stretch that summer, when he pitched a complete game on a Friday, then came in relief two days later.

Warthen did not match his rookie performance. He went 2–10 with a 5.30 ERA for Montreal in 1976. Both his wins were two-hit complete game shutouts. The Expos traded him and Barry Foote to the Philadelphia Phillies for Tim Blackwell and Wayne Twitchell in June 1977, but he pitched only 3 2/3 relief innings for the Phillies. After spending most of 1978 with the Triple-A Oklahoma City 89ers, winning the American Association Pitcher of the Year Award, the Phillies traded him to the Houston Astros on September 2 for Dan Larson. He pitched in five September games for the Astros. His final MLB appearance was his best of the season: he pitched 8 innings and allowed both runs in a 2–1 loss to the San Francisco Giants on September 29. He finished his major-league career with a 12–21 win–loss record and a 4.31 ERA. He continued to pitch in the minors through 1982.

== Coaching career ==
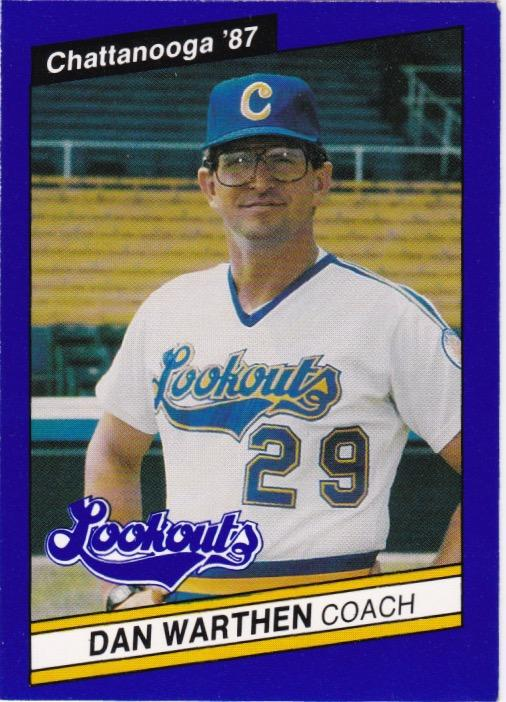
A 1987 baseball card of Warthen as a coach with the Chattanooga Lookouts

Warthen began his coaching career with the Pittsburgh Pirates minor league organization in 1981 and 1982, serving as a player-coach. He was then a minor league instructor for the Philadelphia Phillies for three seasons. He joined the Seattle Mariners in 1987 as pitching coach for the Double-A Chattanooga Lookouts for one year, then the Triple-A Calgary Cannons for three season. He was the major league bullpen coach for Seattle in 1991, advancing to pitching coach in 1992. He was fired after that season with the rest of the team's coaching staff.

He joined the San Diego Padres organization in 1993, working in the minor leagues, including coaching the Triple-A Las Vegas Stars in 1994. He was the Padres pitching coach in 1996 and 1997, then worked the same role for the Detroit Tigers from July 1999 to April 2002. He joined the New York Mets organization in 2003, as pitching coach for the St. Lucie Mets one season and the Triple A Norfolk Tides in 2004 and 2005. Warthen served as the bullpen coach for the Los Angeles Dodgers under manager Grady Little from 2006 to 2007.

On June 17, 2008, Warthen was named the New York Mets pitching coach, replacing Rick Peterson. In the 2012 offseason, rumors speculated that Warthen would not return due to the staff changes, but he stayed along with hitting coach Dave Hudgens. In 2014, Warthen used the slur "Chinaman" in a conversation with an Asian-American interpreter in the clubhouse. He later issued an apology. Warthen was relieved of his coaching position by the Mets on October 3, 2017, but was offered another role with the organization, which he declined. Mets pitchers Noah Syndergaard and Jacob DeGrom supported the team keeping Warthen.

On November 6, 2017, Warthen was hired by the Texas Rangers as the assistant pitching coach. His contract was not renewed after the 2018 season.

== Personal life ==
Warthen is married and has one daughter. He resides in Portland, Oregon.

Warthen turned down college football scholarship offers from the Alabama Crimson Tide, Nebraska Cornhuskers, USC Trojans, UCLA Bruins, Michigan Wolverines, and Northwestern Wildcats to sign with the Expos.

Warthen had knee replacement surgery prior to the 2006 season. He had another knee replacement surgery prior to the 2016 season.

Warthen was friends with Harvey Dorfman, author of several mental skills books.

Preceded by Bill Plummer	Seattle Mariners bullpen coach 1991	Succeeded by Roger Hansen
Preceded by Mike Paul	Seattle Mariners pitching coach 1992	Succeeded by Sammy Ellis
Preceded by Sonny Siebert	San Diego Padres pitching coach 1996–1997	Succeeded by Dave Stewart
Preceded by Rick Adair	Detroit Tigers pitching coach 1999–2002	Succeeded by Steve McCatty
Preceded by Jim Lett	Los Angeles Dodgers bullpen coach 2006–2007	Succeeded by Ken Howell
Preceded by Rick Peterson	New York Mets pitching coach 2008–2017	Succeeded by Dave Eiland
