= George Stueland =

American baseball player (1899–1964)

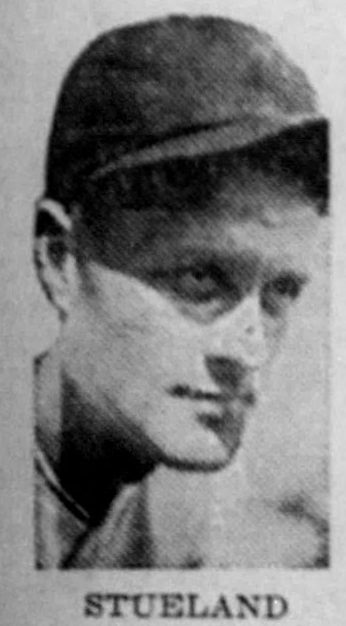
- Stueland in 1924
- Pitcher
- Born: March 2, 1899; Algona, Iowa
- Died: September 9, 1964 (aged 65); Onawa, Iowa
- Batted: Both Threw: Right

MLB debut
- September 15, 1921, for the Chicago Cubs

Last MLB appearance
- May 26, 1925, for the C hicago Cubs

MLB statistics
- Win–loss record: 9–6
- Earned run average: 5.73
- Strikeouts: 52
- Stats at Baseball Reference

Teams
- Chicago Cubs (1921–1923, 1925)

George Anton Stueland was an American professional baseball pitcher who played in Major League Baseball for the Chicago Cubs in the early 1920s. A native of Algona, Iowa, he pitched in 45 games across parts of four seasons for the Cubs. He pitched right-handed.

Pitching for the Sioux Falls Soos in 1921, Stueland compiled a 22-9 record on the season, leading the Dakota League in victories. Following his season with Sioux Falls, Stueland his major league debut with the Chicago Cubs after the conclusion of the Dakota League regular season. On September 7, 1921, before the final Sioux Falls home game, the Sioux Falls team presented Stueland with a gold watch and a pair of spikes. The fans in attendance passed a hat collecting money that was presented to Stueland prior to his departure to Chicago to join the Cubs.

Stueland died on September 9, 1964, in Onawa, Iowa.
