= Basin League =

- Classification: Independent (1953–1959); Collegiate summer baseball (1960–1973)
- Sport: Minor League Baseball; Collegiate summer baseball
- First season: 1953
- Folded: 1973
- President: Al Steinmetz (1955–1960); Cal Ackerman (1961); Bill Baumgartner (1962); Milo Brekhus (1963); Neil Simpson (1964); Floyd Fitzgerald (1965–1973)
- Commissioner: R.M. 'Bus' Walseth (1953–1973)
- No. of teams: 12
- Country: United States of America
- Most titles: 9 Pierre Cowboys (1958–1962, 1965–1967, 1969)
- Sponsors: Black Hills Sports, Inc.
- Website: http://www.attheplate.com/wcbl/basin_league.html

The Basin League was an independent collegiate minor league, that operated from 1953 to 1973, featuring teams primarily from South Dakota and one from Nebraska. The league name reflected the number of teams situated along the Missouri River Basin. The league roster structure evolved from allowing some professional players on each team into rosters being totally amateur. The Basin League was a pioneer of what is known today as collegiate summer baseball.

Over 100 future major league players played in the Basin League, among them Baseball Hall of Fame members Bob Gibson, Jim Palmer and Don Sutton.

== History ==
The Basin League was established in 1953 with a roster of South Dakota franchises and one nearby Nebraska team. Teams in Chamberlain (Chamberlain Chiefs), Mitchell (Mitchell Kernels), Pierre (Pierre Cowboys), Winner (Winner Pheasants), as well as Valentine, Nebraska (Valentine Hearts) were the charter franchises. The league name reflected the number of franchise cities situated along the Missouri River Basin. The Pierre Cowboys played in all 21 seasons of the league's existence.

As the Basin League began play in 1953, team rosters were a mix of professional players and amateurs (upper high school and collegiate players). The Basin League later became exclusively amateur, evolving into what is known today as collegiate summer baseball.

In 1954, the league expanded, as Huron (Huron Elks), Watertown (Watertown Lake Sox) and Yankton (Yankton Terrys) entered the league as expansion franchises.

In 1955, the League ran an advertisement in The Sporting News seeking players. In the April 6, 1955 edition of "The Sporting News": "Class A Players Wanted - For fast semipro Basin League. Capable of playing Class A ball. Write 712 Capital, Yankton, S.D."

In 1958, the league split the season into two halves, with each half winner meeting for the league championship. The Basin League returned to full season play in 1959.

As the league grew the late 1950s, a few Basin League teams were assigned a "'parent" major league club and received equipment and support. The Rapid City Chiefs were assigned to the Los Angeles Dodgers, the Sturgis Titans were assigned to the Boston Red Sox and the Pierre Cowboys were assigned to the Cleveland Indians. While a positive for those franchises, it created an imbalance in support for the other league teams without a sponsoring parent club.

To support their Basin League teams, new stadiums were built in Rapid City and Sturgis, when both teams joined the league as expansion teams in 1957 and 1961 respectively.

The Basin League roster structure changed in 1960. Teams were limited to three professional players per team. In 1961, the number of professionals per team was reduced from three to two. Then, in 1962, none were allowed. Professionals were allowed to manage. But by 1964, professional managers were also excluded. Amateur umpires were used by the league from 1953 to 1960.

From 1962 through 1967, the Basin League received regular national coverage in the weekly publication "The Sporting News." The Sporting News covered the Basin League, as they did with lower minor professional leagues. In 1966, the Basin League amateur talent pool was damaged when the NCAA ruled that NCAA college seniors could no longer play in the league.

To keep their amateur status, most Basin League players received approximately $200-$500 for the summer season, with the pay received for working 'odd jobs' in the local communities. Players often worked for the city recreation departments maintaining public facilities and baseball fields.

The Basin League ceased operations after the 1973 season. The growth of youth baseball had created conflicts for fans. The NCAA had put restrictions on the league, while at the same time, major league teams were reexamining player development resources. The four league teams remaining in the final 1973 season were the Chamberlain Mallards, Pierre Cowboys, Rapid City Chiefs and Sturgis Titans.

In its duration, the league was supported and promoted through the Black Hills Sports Inc. Presidents of the organization were Al Steinmetz from 1955 to 1960, followed by Cal Ackerman in 1961, Bill Baumgartner in 1962, Milo Brekhus in 1963 and Neil Simpson in 1964. Floyd Fitzgerald 1965 to 1973. R.M. 'Bus' Walseth of Pierre, served as league commissioner.

For a time, the Basin League was touted as the best summer college league in the country. Comparable leagues included the Cape Cod League and the Alaska Baseball League.

== League Franchises/Titles ==
| Team name(s) | City represented | Titles | Year(s) active |
|---|---|---|---|
| Chamberlain Chiefs (1953–1956); Chamberlain Mallards (1968–1973) | Chamberlain, South Dakota | (3) 1968, 1970, 1971 | 1953–1956, 1968–1973 |
| Huron Elks | Huron, South Dakota | (2) 1954, 1955 | 1954–1962 |
| Mitchell Kernels | Mitchell, South Dakota | (0) None | 1953–1960 |
| Mobridge Lakers | Mobridge, South Dakota | (1) 1972 | 1966–1972 |
| Pierre Cowboys | Pierre, South Dakota | (9) 1958, 1959, 1960, 1961, 1962, 1965, 1966, 1967, 1969 | 1953–1973 |
| Rapid City Chiefs | Rapid City, South Dakota | (1) 1957 | 1957–1973 |
| Sioux Falls Packers | Sioux Falls, South Dakota | (1) 1964 | 1964–1965 |
| Sturgis Titans | Sturgis, South Dakota | (1) 1973 | 1961–1973 |
| Valentine Hearts | Valentine, Nebraska | (1) 1963 | 1953–1967 |
| Watertown Lake Sox | Watertown, South Dakota | (1) 1956 | 1954–1962 |
| Winner Pheasants | Winner, South Dakota | (1) 1953 | 1953–1957 |
| Yankton Terrys | Yankton, South Dakota | (0) None | 1954–1959 |

== Basin League ballparks ==
- Chamberlain Chiefs/Mallards (1953–1956, 1968–1973): Greig Field. The ballpark is still in use today.
- Huron Elks (1954–1962): Memorial Ballpark Stadium. The ballpark also hosted the Huron Cubs and Huron Phillies minor league teams.
- Mitchell Kernels (1953–1960): Kernel Park. Kernel Park was located adjacent to Joe Quintal Field, which is still in use today as home to Mitchell High School teams.
- Mobridge Lakers (1966-1972): Mobridge Field. The field is still in use and known as the American Legion Memorial Park.
- Pierre Cowboys, (1953–1973): Hyde Stadium. Hyde Stadium is still in use and is located near the state capitol and governor's mansion.
- Rapid City Chiefs (1957–1973): Sioux Park Stadium. Sioux Park Stadium was built specifically for the Chiefs in 1957 and is still in use after being renamed Fitzgerald Stadium.
- Sioux Falls Packers (1964–1965): Sioux Falls Stadium. Sioux Falls Stadium was built in 1941 and was nicknamed "The Birdcage." The ballpark is still in use and has been remodeled as home to the Sioux Falls Canaries.
- Sturgis Titans (1961–1973): Strong Field. Built in 1951, Titan Field was renamed Strong Field in 1967 after the contractor who led the movement to build the facility. It is still in use today for the Sturgis Titans high school teams and American Legion teams.
- Watertown Lake Sox (1954–1962): Watertown Stadium. Watertown Stadium later became the home of the minor league Watertown Expos and is still in use today.
- Winner Pheasants (1953–1957): Leahy Bowl. The Leahy Bowl was named for Winner native Frank Leahy, legendary football coach at Notre Dame University. The baseball field is still in use today.
- Yankton Terrys (1954–1959): Riverside Field. The Ballpark is still in use today as home to the Mount Marty University baseball team. It has been renamed Bob Tereshinski Stadium at Riverside Field after former MMU baseball coach Bob Tereshinski.
- Valentine Hearts (1953–1967): Veterans Memorial Field. Veterans Memorial Field is still in use today as home to American Legion baseball.

== Notable Basin League alumni ==
- Bob Gibson, Chamberlain Chiefs (1956–1957) Inducted Baseball Hall of Fame, 1981
- Pat Gillick, Valentine Hearts (1956–1957) Inducted Baseball Hall of Fame, 2011
- Jim Palmer, Winner Pheasants (1963) Inducted Baseball Hall of Fame, 1990
- Don Sutton, Sioux Falls Packers (1964) Inducted Baseball Hall of Fame, 1998

=== Major League alumni ===
Key: ** Denotes MLB All-Star

- PIERRE COWBOYS (32): Craig Anderson, Gary Beare, Steve Boros, Tom Brown, Mike Caldwell, Mike Cubbage, John DeMerit, Bill Dillman, **Johnny Edwards, **Sammy Ellis, Matt Galante, Carroll Hardy, Jim Howarth, John Herrnstein, Jake Jacobs, Dave Lemonds, John Lowenstein (Baltimore Orioles Hall of Fame), Larry Burchart, Ty Cline, Bill Haywood, Rick Lysander, Mike Pazik, Greg Pryor, Bill Roman, Mac Scarce, Bill Scripture, Ken Tatum, **Kent Tekulve, Del Unser, Milt Welch, Woody Woodward, **Geoff Zahn.
- RAPID CITY CHIEFS (29): Gary Adams, **Stan Bahnsen (1968 AL Rookie of the Year), Dave Baldwin, Tim Belcher, Bill Bethea, Dick Billings, Randy Brown, Lou Camilli, **Dave Collins, Sam Ewing, Jim Fairey, Rich Hacker, Gary Holman, **Frank Howard (Washington Nationals Ring of Honor), Jim Johnson, Rick Kester, Joe Lutz, Jim McAndrew, Gary Moore, Dennis Musgraves, Pat Osburn, Steve Renko, Kal Segrist, Charlie Shoemaker, Bart Shirley, Floyd Temple (MGR), Danny Thompson, Gary Wheelock, Nick Willhite.
- STURGIS TITANS (27): Gary Allenson, Gene Ammann, Bob Baird, Frank Baker, Larry Bearnarth, Dave Campbell, Shaun Fitzmaurice, Jim French, Rusty Gerhardt, Ben Hines, Dick Joyce, Stu Locklin, Nick Leyva, Jim Miles, Dave Moates, Willie Norwood, Mike Proly, **Dan Quisenberry (Kansas City Royals Hall of Fame ), Bob Reed, Glenn Redmon, Dick Selma, John Sevcik, Tommy Smith, Ted Sizemore (1968 NL Rookie of the Year), Luke Walker, Jimy Williams (1999 AL Manager of the Year).
- WINNER PHEASANTS (18): Dick Bertell, Steve Blateric, Jim Burton, Pete Craig, Bill Faul, Purnal Goldy, Bobby Floyd, Gary Gentry, Rocky Krsnich, Don Lee, Mickey Livingston (MGR), **Jim Lonborg (1967 AL Cy Young Award Winner), Tom Lundstedt, Carl Morton (1970 NL Rookie of the Year), **Mickey Owen (MGR), John Noriega, Tony Ordeñana, **Jim Palmer, Merv Rettenmund, Ted Schreiber, Ed Spiezio.
- WATERTOWN LAKE SOX (13): Dennis Aust, Howie Bedell, Bill Davis, Cal Emery, Purnal Goldy, **Dick Howser (MGR- 1985 World Champion KC Royals), Chuck Lindstrom, Ron Perranoski, **Dick Radatz, Dick Ricketts (First pick, 1955 NBA draft), Kermit Wahl, Don Wallace, Eddie Watt (Baltimore Orioles Hall of Fame).
- VALENTINE HEARTS (10): Al Closter, Duffy Dyer, Pat Gillick, Lou Marone, Chuck Dobson, Joe Keough, Al Montreuil, Scott Reid, Dave Robinson, **Paul Splittorff (Kansas City Royals Hall of Fame ), Ken Suarez, Bill Zepp.
- MITCHELL KERNELS (9): Frank Carpin, Doug Clemens, **Eddie Fisher, Dick Green, **Dave Giusti,**Randy Gumpert, Dean Look, **Jim O'Toole (Cincinnati Reds Hall of Fame), **Don Schwall.
- CHAMBERLAIN CHIEFS/MALLARDS (7): Bob Apodaca, Bobby Cuellar, **Bob Gibson, Tom Harmon, Jim Lentine, John Littlefield (MGR), Mickey O'Neil, **John Stearns.
- HURON ELKS (7): Jerry Adair, Jack Brittin, Fritz Fisher, Mike Joyce, Frank Kreutzer, Gary Wagner, Johnny Watson.
- YANKTON TERRYS (6): Ed Hobaugh, Rex Johnston, Bobby Klaus, Bill Lajoie, Marv Olson, (MGR), Norm Stewart (College Basketball Hall of Fame).
- MOBRIDGE LAKERS (4): Derek Bryant, Ron Cash, Gene Hiser, Del Youngblood (MGR).
- SIOUX FALLS PACKERS (4): Al Schmelz, **Don Sutton, Jon Warden, **Clyde Wright.
- HURON ELKS (3): Phil Haugstad, Bobby Klaus, Dave Thies.
