= Jamestown Red Sox =

The Jamestown Red Sox were an integrated semi-professional baseball team based in Jamestown, North Dakota, in the 1930s.

The Red Sox played independently of any league because their mixed race roster was a problem in a period of segregation. As their player-manager from May to October 1934, Ted Radcliffe became the first black man to manage white professional players. With backing from the local Gladstone Hotel, the team also signed Barney Brown, Bill Perkins, and Steel Arm Davis to become the strongest team in North Dakota. The club played 56 games in that year going 40-16. After the regular season, the Red Sox played the Earl Mack Major League All-Stars featuring Jimmie Foxx, Heinie Manush, Pinky Higgins, Doc Cramer, Ted Lyons and Earl Whitehill. Jamestown won three straight games against the "All-Stars".

The team played in grey flannel jerseys decorated with a black felt letter "J" on the left breast and a red felt sock on the right sleeve.

== Notable players ==
- Barney Brown (1934)
- Steel Arm Davis (1934)
- Showboat Fisher (1934)
- Bill Perkins (1934)
- Ted "Double Duty" Radcliffe (1934)
