= Charlie Boardman =

American baseball player (1893–1968)

- Pitcher
- Born: March 27, 1893; Seneca Falls, New York, U.S.
- Died: August 10, 1968 (aged 75); Sacramento, California, U.S.
- Batted: Left Threw: Right

MLB debut
- September 26, 1913, for the Philadelphia Athletics

Last MLB appearance
- September 21, 1915, for the St. Louis Cardinals

MLB statistics
- Win–loss record: 1-2
- Earned run average: 3.06
- Strikeouts: 13
- Stats at Baseball Reference

Teams
- Philadelphia Athletics (1913–1914); St. Louis Cardinals (1915)

Charles Louis Boardman (March 27, 1893 – August 10, 1968) was an American Major League Baseball pitcher. He played for the Philadelphia Athletics during the 1913 and 1914 seasons and the St. Louis Cardinals during the 1915 season. He managed in the Dakota League in 1922 for the Valley City Hi-Liners.
