= Mitchell Kernels =

- 1920–1960; (1920–1923, 1936–1937, 1939–1940, 1953–1960); Mitchell, South Dakota

Minor league affiliations
- Class: Class D (1920–1923, 1936–1937, 1939–1940); Collegiate summer baseball (1953–1960)
- League: South Dakota League (1920); Dakota League (1921–1922); South Dakota League (1923); Nebraska State League (1936–1937); Western League (1939–1940); Basin League (1953-1960)

Major league affiliations
- Team: St. Louis Cardinals (1936–1937)

Minor league titles
- League titles (4): 1920; 1921; 1922; 1936

Team data
- Name: Mitchell Kernels (1920–1923, 1936–1937, 1939–1940, 1953–1960)
- Ballpark: Hitchcock Park (1920–1923); Kernel Park (1936–1937, 1939–1940, 1953–1960)

The Mitchell Kernels were a minor league baseball team based in Mitchell, South Dakota. The Kernels played as members of the South Dakota League (1920), Dakota League (1921–1922), South Dakota League (1923), Nebraska State League (1936–1937) and Western League (1939–1940), winning four league championships. The Mitchell Kernels were a minor league affiliate of the St. Louis Cardinals in 1936 and 1937.

Baseball Hall of Fame member Jim Bottomley played for the 1920 Mitchell Kernels.

The Mitchell Kernels continued play as a member of the collegiate minor league Basin League from 1953 to 1960.

The "Kernels" moniker was adopted by Mitchell High School sports teams in the 1930s.

== History ==
The Mitchell Kernels first played as members of the Class D level 1920 South Dakota League, winning the first of their three consecutive championships. The Mitchell Kernels then played in the Dakota League (1921–1922), South Dakota League (1923), Nebraska State League (1936–1937) and Western League (1939–1940). The Kernels were an affiliate of the St. Louis Cardinals in 1936 and 1937. The Mitchell Kernels won league championships in 1920, 1921, 1922 and 1936.

The Mitchell use of the "Kernels" moniker corresponds to Mitchell, South Dakota being home to the famed Corn Palace, which was built in 1892.

The Mitchell Kernels resumed play in 1953 as charter members of the Basin League (1953–1973), an independent collegiate minor league. In its duration the Basin League evolved from rosters containing some professional players to rosters being totally amateur, becoming a pioneer in what is known today as Collegiate summer baseball. Mitchell played in the Basin League from 1953–1960. Mitchell was a charter member of the 1953 Basin league along with Chamberlain, Huron, Mitchell, Pierre, Watertown, Winner and Yankton, as well as Valentine, Nebraska. Mitchell did not win a championship while playing in the Basin League. Future major league players Frank Carpin, Doug Clemens, Doc Daugherty, Eddie Fisher, Dick Green, Dave Giusti, Dean Look, Jim O'Toole and Don Schwall played for the Mitchell Kernels' Basin League teams.

Today, the Kernels moniker has been the long-time moniker of Mitchell High School, who first adopted the nickname in the 1930s.

== Championship seasons ==
In their first season of minor league play, as charter members of the Class D level South Dakota League, the Mitchell Kernels won the league championship. They would win three consecutive championships. Mitchell ended the 1920 season with a record of 61–36, 1st in the league standings under Manager Henry Scharnweber. The league had no playoffs for its duration. In the eight–team league, Mitchell finished 3.0 games ahead of the Sioux Falls Soos (58–40), followed by the Huron Packers (56–40), Wessington Springs Saints (49–48), Redfield Reds/Red Sox (46–49), Madison Greys (42–50), Aberdeen Boosters (42–54) and Miller Climbers/Jugglers (28–65). In his first professional season, Baseball Hall of Fame member Jim Bottomley played for Mitchell in 1920, hitting .312 with 7 home runs in 97 games.

In 1921, the league changed names to the Dakota League and Mitchell defended their title. Continuing play under Manager Henry Scharnweber, the Kernels finished in 1st place with a 65–33 record, 3.0 games ahead of the 2nd place Sioux Falls Soos (61–35). They were followed in the standings by the Wahpeton-Breckenridge Twins (55–43), Redfield Red Sox (47–46), Madison (45–50), Watertown Cubs (44–53), Aberdeen Grays (35–62) and Huron Packers (34–64).

The Kernels won their third consecutive championship, becoming the 1922 Dakota League Champions. Mitchell finished 60–37, again managed by Henry Scharnweber. Mitchell finished 4.5 games ahead of the 2nd place Aberdeen Grays (56–42) and Fargo Athletics (56–42), followed by the Sioux Falls Soos (55–42), Jamestown Jimkotans (46–51), Watertown Cubs (42–54), Wahpeton-Breckenridge Twins (42–55) and the Valley City Hi-Liners/Bismarck Capitals (30–64). In 1923, Mitchell was unable to defend their tiles as the South Dakota league folded during the season on July 13, 1923 with Mitchell in 3rd place.

In 1936, the Mitchell Kernels the won league championship as the franchise resumed play in the Class D level Nebraska State League. Playing as an affiliate of the St. Louis Cardinals, the Kernels ended the six–team Nebraska State League regular season with a record of 68–50, placing 2nd in the standings, 2.0 games behind the Sioux Falls Canaries. Cliff Knox was the Mitchell manager. In the Playoffs, the Mitchell Kernels beat the Norfolk Elks 3 games to 1. In the Finals, the Mitchell Kernels defeated the Sioux Falls Canaries 4 games to 2.

== The ballparks ==
From 1920 to 1923, Mitchell teams were noted to have played minor league home games at Hitchcock Park. The ballpark was located on East Hanson Street between South Gamble Street & South Foster Street in Mitchell South Dakota. Today, Hitchcock Park is still in use as a public park area with a baseball field. The address is 1201 E Hanson Avenue, Mitchell, South Dakota.

Beginning in 1936 minor league Kernels reportedly played home games at Kernel Park. Kernel Park stood on a site directly adjacent to "Joe Quintal Field", which was built in 1941. Joe Quintal Field is still in use as home to Mitchell High School and Dakota Wesleyan University sports teams. Joe Quintal Field is located at 501 East 11th Avenue, Mitchell, South Dakota.

== Timeline ==
Year(s)	# Yrs.	Team	Level	League
1920	1	Mitchell Kernels	Class D	South Dakota League
1921–1922	2	Mitchell Kernels	Class D	Dakota League
1923	1	Mitchell Kernels	Class D	South Dakota League
1936–1937	2	Mitchell Kernels	Class D	Nebraska State League
1939–1940	2	Mitchell Kernels	Class D	Western League
1953–1960	8	Mitchell Kernels	Collegiate Summer	Basin League

=== Year–by–year records ===
Year	Record	Finish	Manager	Playoffs/Notes
1920	61–36	1st	Hank Scharnweber	League champions
1921	65–33	1st	Hank Scharnweber	League champions
1922	60–37	1st	Hank Scharnweber	League champions
1923	28–27	3rd	Hank Scharnweber	League disbanded July 17
1936	68–50	2nd	Cliff Knox	League champions
1937	75–41	2nd	Cliff Knox	No playoffs held
1939	49–69	5th	Red Davis	No playoffs held
1940	44–70	4th	Ed Grayston / Jimmy Zinn	Sioux City Soos moved to Mitchell July 24

== Notable alumni ==
=== Baseball Hall of Fame alumni ===
- Jim Bottomley (1920) Inducted, 1974

=== Notable alumni ===
- Frank Carpin (1956)
- Doug Clemens (1959)
- Doc Daugherty (1954)
- Eddie Fisher (1957) MLB All-Star
- Red Fisher (1920)
- Dick Green (1959) MLB All-Star
- Dave Giusti (1959) MLB All-Star
- Lou Kahn (1936)
- Cliff Knox (MGR, 1936-1937)
- Doyle Lade (1939)
- Louis Leroy (1920)
- Jimmie Long (1920)
- Dean Look (1959) NFL Official
- Dave Odom (1936)
- Jim O'Toole (1957) MLB All-Star; Cincinnati Reds Hall of Fame
- Del Paddock (1920)
- Don Schwall (1957) MLB All-Star; 1961 AL Rookie of the Year
- Biggs Wehde (1940)
- Jimmy Zinn (MGR, 1940)

=== See also ===
Mitchell Kernels players
