= Frank Withrow =

American baseball player (1891-1966)

- Catcher
- Born: June 14, 1891; Greenwood, Missouri, U.S.
- Died: September 5, 1966 (aged 75); Omaha, Nebraska, U.S.
- Batted: Right Threw: Right

MLB debut
- April 15, 1920, for the Philadelphia Phillies

Last MLB appearance
- September 27, 1922, for the Philadelphia Phillies

MLB statistics
- Batting average: .203
- Home runs: 0
- Runs batted in: 15
- Stats at Baseball Reference

Teams
- Philadelphia Phillies (1920, 1922)

Frank Blaine Withrow (June 14, 1891 – September 5, 1966), nicknamed "Kid", was an American professional baseball player. He played two seasons, 1920 and 1922, in Major League Baseball for the Philadelphia Phillies, primarily as a catcher. In 58 games, Withrow had 31 hits in 153 at bats, for a .203 batting average. He batted and threw right-handed.

Withrow was born in Greenwood, Missouri, and died in Omaha, Nebraska.
