= Bill Shipke =

American baseball player (1882-1940)

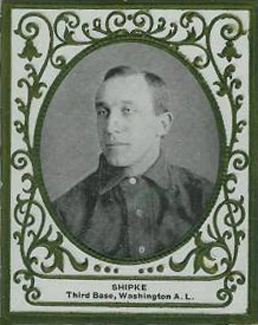
- Third baseman
- Born: November 18, 1882; St. Louis, Missouri, U.S.
- Died: September 10, 1940 (aged 57); Omaha, Nebraska, U.S.
- Batted: Right Threw: Right

MLB debut
- April 23, 1906, for the Cleveland Naps

Last MLB appearance
- May 13, 1909, for the Washington Senators

MLB statistics
- Batting average: .199
- Home runs: 1
- Runs batted in: 29
- Stats at Baseball Reference

Teams
- Cleveland Naps (1906); Washington Senators (1907–1909)

William Martin Shipke (November 18, 1882 – September 10, 1940) was an American Major League Baseball third baseman who played for four seasons. He played for the Cleveland Naps in 1906 and the Washington Senators from 1907 to 1909.
