= Watertown Cubs =

- (1921–1923); Watertown, South Dakota

Minor league affiliations
- Class: Class D (1921–1923)
- League: Dakota League (1921–1922); South Dakota League (1923)

Major league affiliations
- Team: None

Minor league titles
- League titles (0): None

Team data
- Name: Watertown Cubs (1921–1923)
- Ballpark: Riverside Park (1921–1923)

The Watertown Cubs were a minor league baseball team based in Watertown, South Dakota. The unaffiliated Cubs played as members of the Class D level Dakota League in 1921 and 1922 and South Dakota League in 1923. Watertown hosted minor league home games at Riverside Park.

== History ==
Minor league baseball began in Watertown, South Dakota when the 1921 Watertown "Cubs" became members of the eight–team Class D level Dakota League. In their first season of play, the Cubs finished the 1921 season with a 44–53 record, placing sixth, playing the season under manager Mattie McGrath. Watertown finished 20½ games behind the first place Mitchell Kernels.

Watertown hosted their home minor league games at Riverside Park in Watertown.

In 1922, the Watertown Cubs played in the final season of the Dakota League, which continued as an eight–team, Class D level league. Watertown Watertown finished in sixth place with a 42–54 regular season record. Playing under manager John Mokate, the Cubs finished 17.5 games behind the first place Mitchell Kernels.

To minimize travel, the Dakota League was divided into two Class D level leagues in 1923. The two new leagues, each with four teams, were the South Dakota League and the North Dakota League in 1923. The Watertown Cubs played in the 1923 South Dakota League and finished last as the league folded during the season. When the South Dakota League folded on July 17, 1923, the Cubs ended the season with a record of 15–41 record under manager Wib Smith, placing fourth, finishing 19½ games behind the first place Sioux Falls Soos.

The Watertown Cubs were followed in organized baseball by the Watertown "Lake Sox," a Basin League collegiate summer team, that played from 1954 to 1962. The Watertown Expos resumed minor league play in 1971 as an affiliate of the Montreal Expos, playing in the Northern League.

== The ballpark ==
The Watertown Cubs played home minor league games at Riverside Park. Today, Riverside Park is still in use as a public park.

== Timeline ==
Year(s)	# Yrs.	Team	Level	League	Ballpark
1921–1922	2	Watertown Cubs	Class D	Dakota League	Riverisde Park
1923	1	Watertown Cubs	Class D	South Dakota League	Riverisde Park

== Year–by–year records ==
Year	Record	Finish	Manager	Playoffs/Notes
1921	44–53	6th	Mattie McGrath	No playoffs held
1922	42–54	6th	John Mokate	No playoffs held
1923	15–41	4th	Wib Smith	League disbanded July 17

== Notable alumni ==
- Wib Smith (1923, MGR)
- Jerry Standaert (1922)
- Lefty Taber (1921)

== See also ==
Watertown Cubs players
