= Showboat Fisher =

American baseball player (1899–1994)

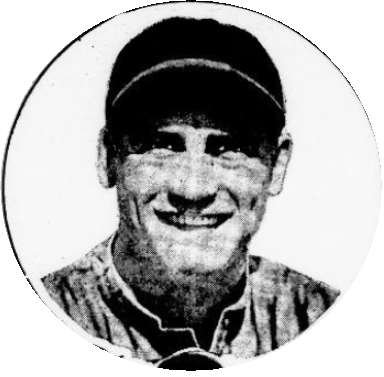
- Outfielder
- Born: January 16, 1899; Wesley, Iowa, U.S.
- Died: May 15, 1994 (aged 95); St. Cloud, Minnesota, U.S.
- Batted: Left Threw: Right

MLB debut
- April 24, 1923, for the Washington Senators

Last MLB appearance
- August 4, 1932, for the St. Louis Browns

MLB statistics
- Batting average: .335
- Home runs: 8
- Runs batted in: 71
- Stats at Baseball Reference

Teams
- Washington Senators (1923–24); St. Louis Cardinals (1930); St. Louis Browns (1932)

George Aloys "Showboat" Fisher (January 16, 1899 – May 15, 1994) was an American professional baseball player who played in the 1930 World Series with the St. Louis Cardinals. He had a .335 lifetime batting average (114-for-340) in Major League Baseball with 8 home runs and 71 RBI in 138 games. He played several games for the racially integrated Jamestown Red Sox in 1934 under the management of Ted Radcliffe.

He was the last surviving member of the 1924 Washington Senators, the last DC team to win the World Series, until the Nationals won in 2019.
