= Wib Smith =

American baseball player

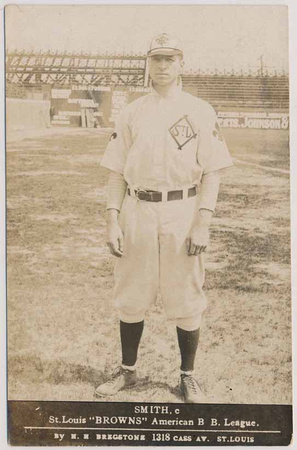
- Catcher
- Born: August 30, 1886; Evart, Michigan
- Died: November 18, 1959 (aged 73); Fargo, North Dakota
- Batted: Right Threw: Right

MLB debut
- May 31, 1909, for the St. Louis Browns

Last MLB appearance
- September 29, 1909, for the St. Louis Browns

MLB statistics
- Batting average: .190
- Home runs: 0
- Runs batted in: 2
- Stats at Baseball Reference

Teams
- St. Louis Browns (1909)

Wilbur Floyd "Wib" Smith (August 30, 1886 – November 18, 1959) was a Major League Baseball catcher who played in 1909 with the St. Louis Browns.
