= Roy Patterson =

American baseball player (1876–1953)

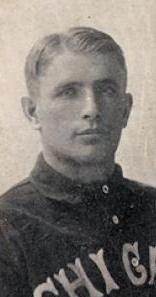
- Pitcher
- Born: December 17, 1876; Stoddard, Wisconsin, U.S.
- Died: April 14, 1953 (aged 76); St. Croix Falls, Wisconsin, U.S.
- Batted: Right Threw: Right

MLB debut
- April 24, 1901, for the Chicago White Sox

Last MLB appearance
- September 16, 1907, for the Chicago White Sox

MLB statistics
- Win–loss record: 81–72
- Earned run average: 2.75
- Strikeouts: 442
- Stats at Baseball Reference

Teams
- Chicago White Sox (1901–1907)

Career highlights and awards
- World Series champion (1906)

Roy Lewis Patterson (December 17, 1876 – April 14, 1953) was an American pitcher in Major League Baseball. Nicknamed "the Boy Wonder", he played for the Chicago White Sox from 1901 to 1907.

Patterson started his professional baseball career for the Western League's St. Paul Saints in 1899. The following year, the team became known as the Chicago White Sox of the American League; in 1901, the American League became a major league. Patterson hit his peak in 1900-03, winning 15 or more games each year. On April 24, 1901, he became the first AL winning pitcher, as the other games that day were rained out. That season, Patterson won 20 games for the only time in the majors and led the White Sox in games started and innings pitched. Chicago won the pennant.

After 1903, Patterson remained an effective pitcher, but his workload diminished. He joined the American Association's Minneapolis Millers in 1908, pitching most of the next decade for them and winning over 20 games in four different seasons. He pitched and managed in the Dakota League from 1921 to 1922 before retiring.

Patterson took over his father's freight-hauling business after his baseball career ended. Patterson died of a heart attack on April 14, 1953 in St. Croix Falls, Wisconsin.
