= Huron Phillies =

- 1920–1970; (1920–1921, 1965–1970); Huron, South Dakota

Minor league affiliations
- Class: Class D (1920–1921); Class A (1965); Short-Season Class A (1966–1970)
- League: South Dakota League (1920); Dakota League (1921); Basin League (1954–1962); Northern League (1966–1970)

Major league affiliations
- Team: Philadelphia Phillies (1965–1968); Chicago Cubs (1969–1970)

Minor league titles
- League titles (0): None

Team data
- Name: Huron Packers (1920–1921); Huron Phillies (1965–1968); Huron Cubs (1969–1970)
- Ballpark: Memorial Park Stadium (1920–1921, 1965–1970)

The Huron Phillies was a primary name of a minor league baseball teams based Huron, South Dakota between 1920 and 1970. Huron teams last played in the Northern League from 1965 to 1970. Previous Huron minor league teams played as members of the Dakota League in 1920, South Dakota League in 1921 and Basin League 1954 to 1962.

Huron was a minor league affiliate of the Philadelphia Phillies from 1965 to 1968 and Chicago Cubs from 1969 to 1970.

== History ==
The Huron Phillies began minor league play as members of the Northern League in 1965. Huron had previously hosted the Huron Packers, who played as members of the charter members of the South Dakota League in 1920 and Dakota League in 1921. Huron was a minor league affiliate of the Philadelphia Phillies from 1965 to 1968 and Chicago Cubs in 1969 and 1970, playing the last two seasons as the Huron Cubs . The Huron minor league franchise folded following the 1970 season and the Northern League folded in 1971.

== The ballpark ==
Huron teams were noted to have played minor league home games at Memorial Park Stadium. Memorial Park Stadium is still in use today, located at 390 Jersey Avenue NE, Huron, South Dakota.

== Timeline ==
Year(s)	# Yrs.	Team	Level	League	Affiliate
1920	1	Huron Packers	Class D	South Dakota League	None
1921	1	Huron Packers	Class D	Dakota League	None
1954–1962	9	Huron Elks	Collegiate Summer	Basin League	None
1965–1968	4	Huron Phillies	Class A	Northern League	Philadelphia Phillies
1969–1970	2	Huron Cubs	Class A	Northern League	Chicago Cubs

== Year-by-year record ==
Year	Record	Finish	Manager	Playoffs
1920	56-40	3rd	Bill Shipke	No playoffs held
1921	34-64	8th	Jay Andrews	No playoffs held
1965	31-35	3rd	Joe Lonnett	No playoffs held
1966	32-35	3rd	Joe Lonnett	No playoffs held
1967	37-40	4th	Joe Lonnett	No playoffs held
1968	26-43	5th	Dallas Green	No playoffs held
1969	31-39	4th	Mel Wright	No playoffs held
1970	37-31	2nd	Jimmy Freese	No playoffs held

== Notable alumni ==
- Pat Bourque (1969)
- Bill Bonham (1970)
- Bill Champion (1965)
- Mike Compton (1965)
- Larry Cox (1966)
- Red Fisher (1921, MGR)
- Dallas Green (1968, MGR) Manager: 1980 World Series Champion - Philadelphia Phillies; Philadelphia Phillies Wall of Fame
- Toby Harrah (1967) 4x MLB All-Star; Texas Rangers Hall of Fame
- Jesús Hernáiz (1969)
- Larry Hisle (1966) 2x MLB All-Star; 1977 AL RBI Leader
- Greg Luzinski (1968) 4x MLB All-Star; Philadelphia Phillies Wall of Fame
- Dyar Miller (1968)
- Rick Reuschel (1970) 3x MLB All-Star; San Francisco Giants Wall of Fame
- Ken Reynolds (1966)
- Bill Shipke (1920, MGR)
- Thomas Silicato (1965)
- Art Thomason (1920)
- Andre Thornton (1967) 2x MLB All-Star; Cleveland Indians Hall of Fame
- Jim Todd (1969)
- Manny Trillo (1968) 4x MLB All-Star
- John Vukovich (1966)
- Mutt Wilson (1920)
- Mel Wright (1969, MGR)

== See also ==
- Huron Phillies players
- Huron Cubs players
- Huron Packers players
