= List of baseball parks in Omaha, Nebraska =

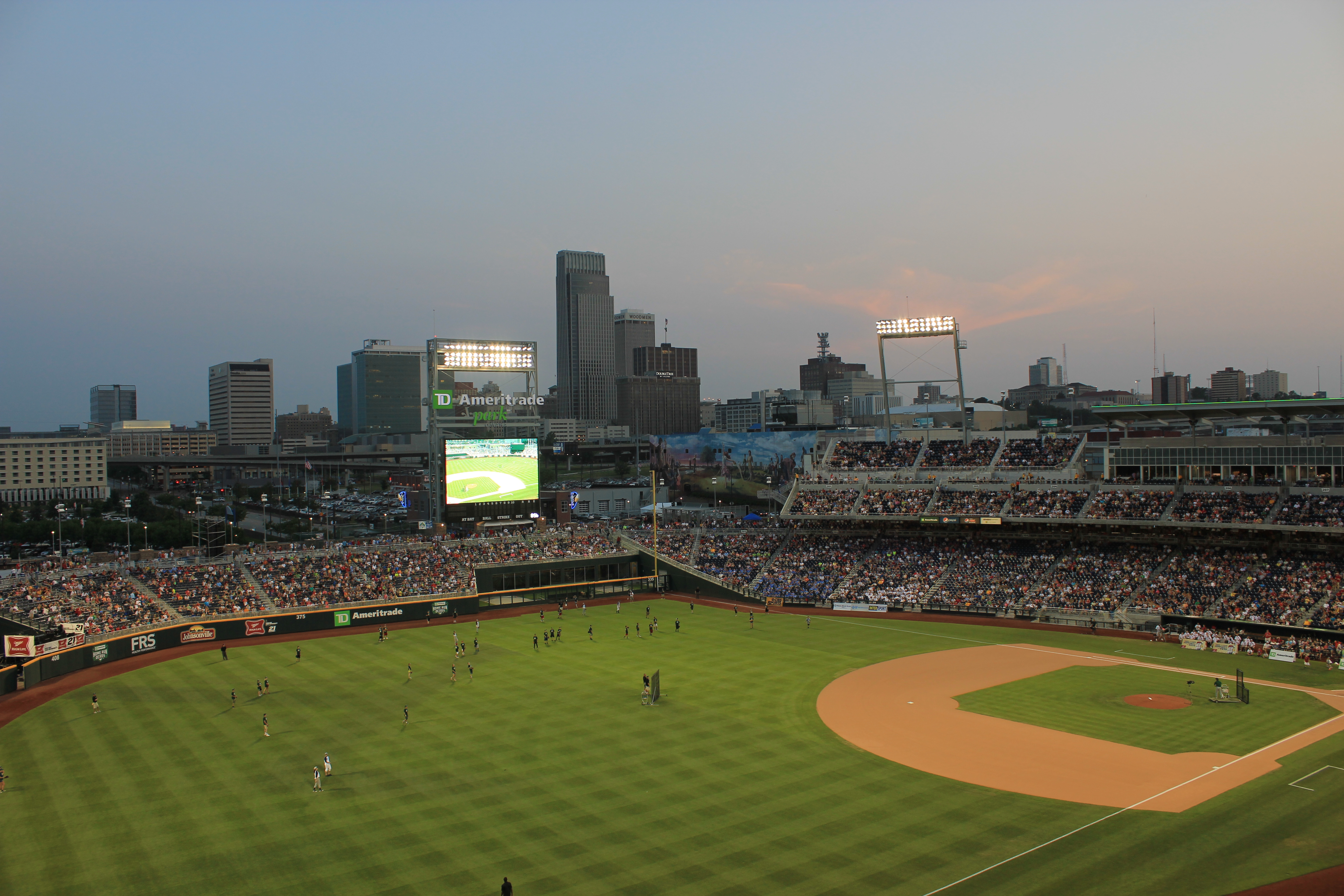
Charles Schwab Field

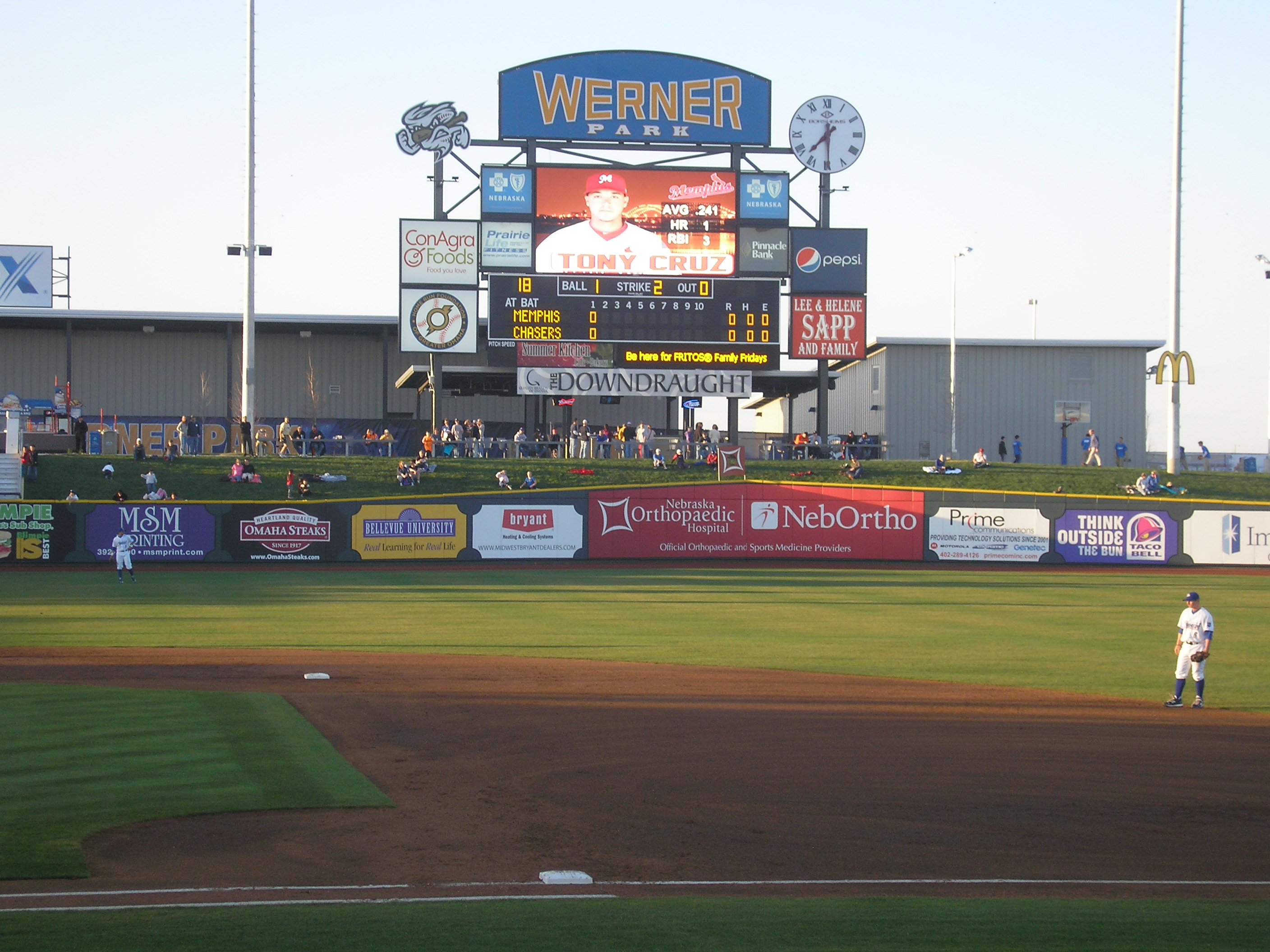
Werner Park

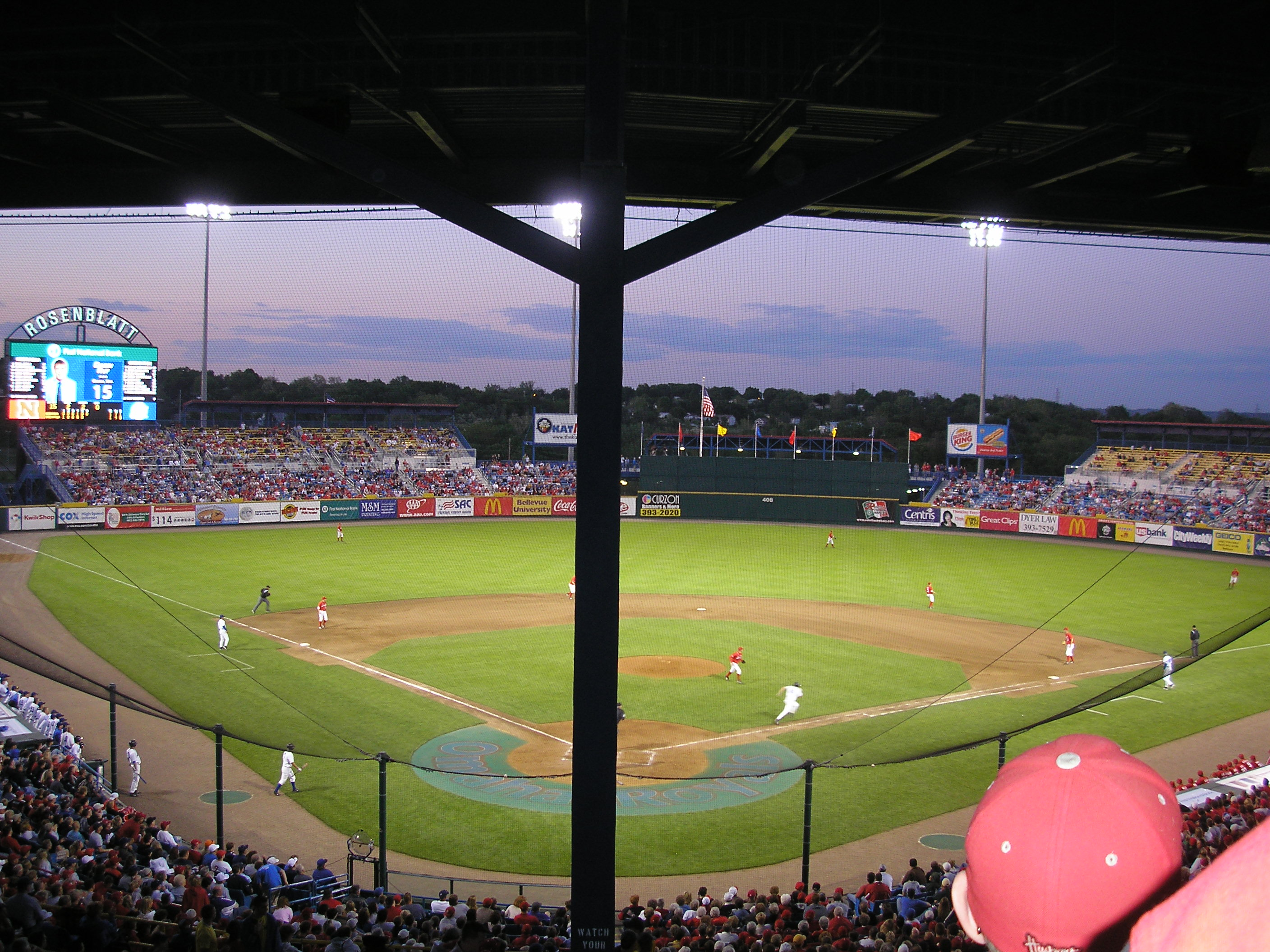
Rosenblatt Stadium

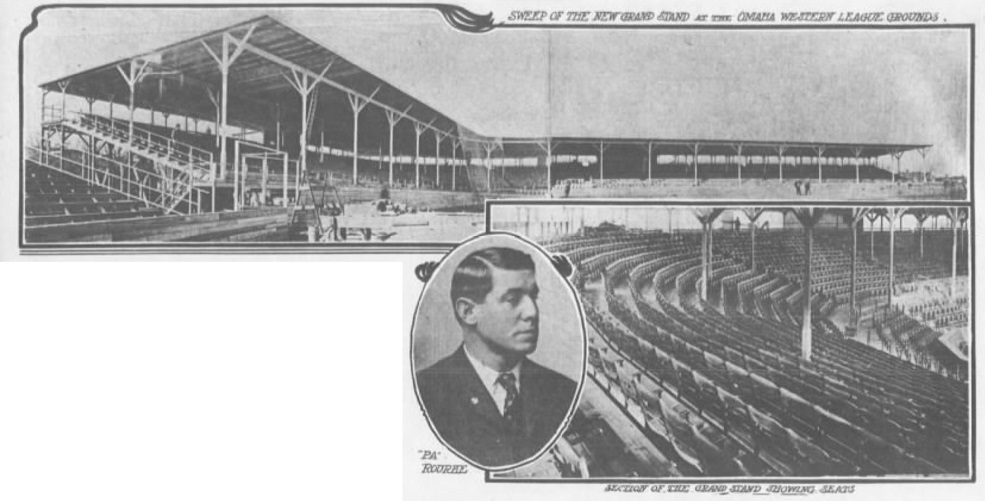
Vinton Street Park

This is a list of venues used for professional baseball in and around Omaha, Nebraska. The information is a synthesis of the information contained in the references listed.

== Omaha "ball grounds" ==
Home of
Omaha Mashers or Green Stockings – Northwestern League (1879 – league disbanded during season)
Location
"in Lake's addition, at the northern terminus of the street railway" – somewhere near 18th and Lake Streets – "about 18th and Ohio" [2 blocks south of Locust]
Currently
residential

== Omaha Baseball Grounds ==
Home of
- Omaha Omahogs – Western League (1885 part season)
- Omaha Omahogs or Union Pacifics – WL (1887)
- Omaha Omahogs or Omahosses / Lambs – Western Association (1888–1891)
- Omaha Omahogs – WL (1892 part season)
Location
North 20th Street (east, first base); buildings and Locust Street (north, right field); buildings and North 22nd Street (west, left field); Miami Street (south, third base); Maple Street teed into the property on the left field side [per 1890 Sanborn map] – about a mile north-northwest of the site of TD Ameritrade Park
Later
Y.M.C.A. Park, then University Park [University Athletic Club]
Currently
residential

== Charles Street Park ==
Home of
Omaha Omahogs or Indians – Western Association (1894–mid-1895)
Location
Charles Street; 17th Street (east); 18th Street (west)
Afterward
converted to bicycle race track after ball club moved to Fair Grounds
Currently
residential and commercial

== Fair Grounds ==
Home of
Omaha Omahogs or Indians – WA (part of 1895, after leaving Charles Street – then moved to Denver)
Location
Ames Avenue between 16th Street and 20th Street
Currently
residential

== Omaha Base Ball Park or Ames Avenue Park ==
Home of
Omaha Omahogs or Babes – WL (1898 part season – moved to St. Joseph)
Location
Ames Avenue (south, home plate); 24th Street (east); 25th Street (west) – "where the Prairie Park addition is now located"
Later
another Y.M.C.A. Park
Currently
commercial businesses

== Omaha Baseball Park ==
Home of
- Omaha Omahogs/Indians/Rangers/Rourkes/Buffaloes/Crickets/Packers – WL (1900–mid-1935 – moved to Council Bluffs Rails)
- Omaha Robin Hoods – WL (1936 part season – moved to Rock Island after ballpark burned)
Location
2519 South 15th Street (west, third base); Vinton Street (south, first base); buildings and Castelar Street (north, left field); buildings and South 13th Street (east, right field) [per 1901 Sanborn map] – about half a mile north of the site of Rosenblatt Stadium
Currently
residential

== Ballpark at Lake Manawa ==
Home of
Council Bluffs Bluffers – Iowa–South Dakota League (1903 part season)
Location
near Lake Manawa, south of Council Bluffs, Iowa
Currently
Lake Manawa State Park

== American Legion Park or Broadway Park ==
Home of
- Council Bluffs Rails – WL (mid-1935, moved from Omaha Packers)
- Omaha Cardinals – WL (1947–1948)
Location
Council Bluffs, Iowa – West Broadway (north, left field); 35th Street (west, third base); buildings and 34th Street (east, right field); railroad tracks (south, first base) [per city directory]
Currently
commercial businesses

== Johnny Rosenblatt Stadium orig. Omaha Baseball Park or Municipal Stadium ==
Home of
- Omaha Cardinals – WL / American Association (1949–1959)
- Omaha Dodgers – AA 1961–1962
- Omaha Royals – AA / Pacific Coast League 1969–2010
- College World Series (1950–2010)
Location
Deer Park Boulevard (later Grover Street, now Bob Gibson Boulevard) (north, left field); South 13th Street (west, third base); B Street (later Bert Murphy Avenue South) (south, first base); South 10th Street (east, right field); Omaha's Henry Doorly Zoo (east and northeast, right and center fields, across 10th Street)
Currently
zoo parking lot; ballpark partially preserved, as "Infield at the Zoo"

== Charles Schwab Field Omaha orig. TD Ameritrade Park Omaha ==
Home of
- College World Series (2011–present)
- Creighton Bluejays baseball (2011–present)
- Kansas City Royals – American League (one game in 2019)
Location
1200 Mike Fahey Street (south, right field); North 13th Street (west, first base); Cuming Street (north, third base); South 10th Street (east, left field)

== Werner Park ==
Home of
- Omaha Royals/Golden Spikes/Royals/Storm Chasers – PCL (2011–present)
- Omaha Mavericks (NCAA) 2013−2020
Location
(Papillion, Nebraska) 12356 Ballpark Way (south, first base); South 126th Street (west, third base); Lincoln Road (north, left field); South 123rd Street (east, right field)

== See also ==
- Lists of baseball parks
