= Sioux City Corn Huskers =

- 1888–1902; (1888–1891, 1894, 1900, 1902); Sioux City, Iowa

Minor league affiliations
- Class: Independent (1888–1891); Class A (1894, 1900); Class D (1902)
- League: Western Association (1888–1891); Western League (1894); Western League II (1900); Iowa-South Dakota League (1902)

Major league affiliations
- Team: None

Minor league titles
- League titles (2): 1891; 1894

Team data
- Name: Sioux City Corn Huskers (1888–1891); Sioux City Cornhuskers (1894, 1900, 1902)
- Ballpark: Evans Driving Park Baseball Grounds (1888–1891, 1894 ) Riverside Baseball Grounds (1900, 1902)

The Sioux City Corn Huskers (and the interchangeable "Cornhuskers") were an early minor league baseball team based in Sioux City, Iowa, United States. The Corn Huskers teams played as members of the Western Association (1888–1891) and Western League (1894), winning 1891 and 1894 league championships.

Following the 1891 regular season, the Sioux City Corn Huskers were victorious in both post-season series against the major league Chicago Orphans and St. Louis Browns teams, hosting both series at home.

The team became the St. Paul Saints in 1895 after Charles Comiskey purchased the franchise and moved the team to St. Paul, Minnesota. In 1900 Comiskey relocated the team from St. Paul to become the Chicago White Sox of the American League.

Following their Western League tenure, Sioux City Cornhusker teams played as a member of the 1900 Western League II and 1902 Iowa-South Dakota League, evolving to become the Sioux City Soos beginning in 1903.

The Sioux City Corn Husker teams hosted home minor league home games at the Evans Driving Park Baseball Grounds until 1900, when the team began play at the Riverside Baseball Grounds.

== History ==
=== 1888 to 1890: Western Association ===
In their first season of minor league play, Sioux City joined a newly formed minor league during the 1888 season. The Sioux City Corn Huskers became charter members of the Class A level Western Association during the season. In forming the ten–team Western Association Sioux City joined with the Chicago Maroons, Davenport Onion Weeders, Des Moines Prohibitionists, Kansas City Blues, Milwaukee Brewers, Minneapolis Millers, Omaha Omahogs, Saint Paul Apostles and St. Louis Whites franchises in the newly formed league.

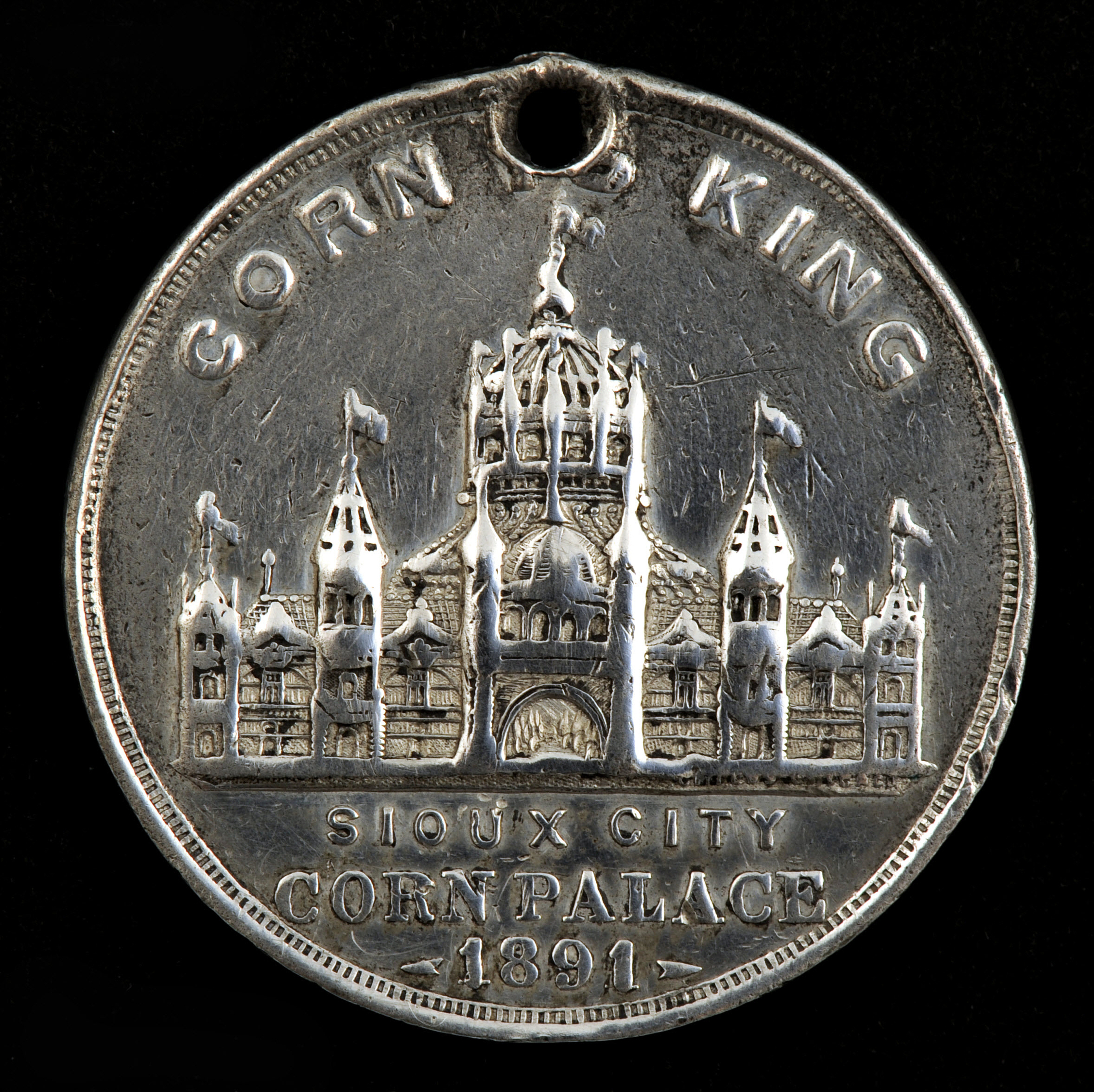
(1891) Sioux City Corn Palace Owney tag. From the National Postal Museum.

In the era before formal team nicknames, the "Corn Huskers" nickname derived from local newspapers as was common in the early minor league era. The newspapers dubbed the Sioux City team as "the Corn Huskers from the Corn Palace City." In the era, Sioux City was the home to elaborate 200 foot tall Corn Palaces that were constructed annually between 1887 and 1891 to celebrate the fall harvest. The structures were made using corn husks, stalks and silks.

After the St. Louis Whites disbanded on June 20, the Sioux City Corn Huskers joined the league on July 4, 1888, playing their first game on that date at Des Moines. After beginning play, the Sioux City team folded in the 1888 season, playing in the ten-team Western Association season, finishing the season with a 21–38 record playing the season under managers Will Bryan and Jim Powell. The first place Kansas City Blues led in the final league standings. The champion Kansas City team featured Baseball Hall of Fame pitcher Kid Nichols, who led the Western Association pitchers with both 16–2 record and 1.14 ERA at 18 years of age.

After player/manager Will Bryan left Sioux City and finished the 1888 season with Hutchinson in the Western League, first baseman Jim Powell began a three-season tenure as the Sioux City player/manager at age 28. Powell had been the player/manager of the Charleston Seagulls to begin the 1888 season, having also managed Charleston the prior two seasons. After joining Sioux City, Powell batted .256 with one home run while appearing in 58 games for the Corn Huskers. Prior to his tenure with the Corn Huskers, Powell had previously played in the major leagues with the 1884 Richmond Virginians and 1885 Philadelphia Athletics, appearing in 60 total games and batting .217.

Known as a strong fielder, infielder Davy Force was 38 years old when he played for the Huskers in 1888, his final professional season as a player, batting .210 in 66 games. Playing seven seasons with the National League's Buffalo Bisons, between 1871 and 1886 Force played at the major league level with nine different teams in total, collecting 1,060 career hits and one career home run in 1,029 career games, batting .249. He later was implicated in the newspapers, but not charged in an 1896 murder that occurred in San Francisco, California.

Despite folding in 1888, Sioux City returned to play as members of the 1889 Western Association. Defending champion Kansas City Blues did not return to play, replaced by the St. Joseph Clay Eaters in the eight-team league.

Sioux City ended the 1889 season in fourth place in the eight-team league. Jim Powell returned as manager as the Corn Huskers finished with a 59–61 record. The Omaha Omahogs won the league title with a 83–38 record, finishing 20½ games ahead of Sioux City and 8.0 games ahead of the second place St. Paul Apostles. Corn Husker Monk Cline won the league batting title in 1889, hitting .364. He also scored 172 runs to lead the league and had 15 home runs and 93 RBIs. Omaha was led to their championship by their manager, Baseball Hall of fame member Frank Selee and pitcher Kid Nichols who won 39 games and struck out 369 batters while pitching 438 innings in 49 games. Nichols started 47 games and completed all 47, compiling a 1.74 ERA on the season.

On August 23, 1889, Omaha and Sioux City played a memorable game on Ladies Day in a game at Omaha, as Kid Nichols led Omaha to a 3–2 victory in front of a large crowd in Omana.

A colorful, journeyman minor league pitcher, Bob Black joined Sioux City in the middle of the 1889 season. Black would continue to play for Sioux City teams though his age 40 season in 1903 and he remained a resident of the city for the remainer of his life. Later, in 1902, Black became manager of the nearby Le Mars Blackbirds of the Iowa-South Dakota League, where the team nickname derived from Black and his son Bob Black Jr, who played for the team. As a retired major league player, Black was recruited to become the manager after being spotted watching a game from the stands early in the season. In 1903, while returning as the Le Mars president, Black signed future Baseball Hall of Fame member Branch Rickey, to a contract after Rickey graduated from high school. Rickey is best known for signing Jackie Robinson to the Brooklyn Dodgers while serving as Brooklyn's General Manager.

His pitching arm damaged, George Bradley pitched briefly and played third base for Sioux City in 1889, his final professional season at age 36. In his major league career, Bradley compiled a record of 172–151 with a 2.43 career ERA while pitching for the Philadelphia Quakers (1883), Baltimore Orioles (1883–1886), Brooklyn Grays (1886–1887) and Pittsburgh Alleghenys (1888).

Sioux City continued Western Association membership in the 1890 season The Corn Huskers ended the season in fifth place in the eight-team league. Sioux city had a record of 55–64 in Jim Powell's final season with the team as the Corn Huskers finished 24.0 games behind the Kansas City Blues, who rejoined the league. Ending the season with a record of 78–39, Kansas City finished first in the standings of the eight-team league.

Pitcher Hardie Henderson played for Sioux City in 1890, his final professional season at age 27. Henderson compiled a 81-121 record with a 3.51 ERA in his major league career with the Philadelphia Quakers (1883), Baltimore Orioles (1883–1886), Brooklyn Grays (1886–1887) and Pittsburgh Alleghenys (1888). Henderson died at the age of 40 in 1903, when he was fatally struck by a train trolley in Philadelphia.

=== 1891: Western Association championship ===
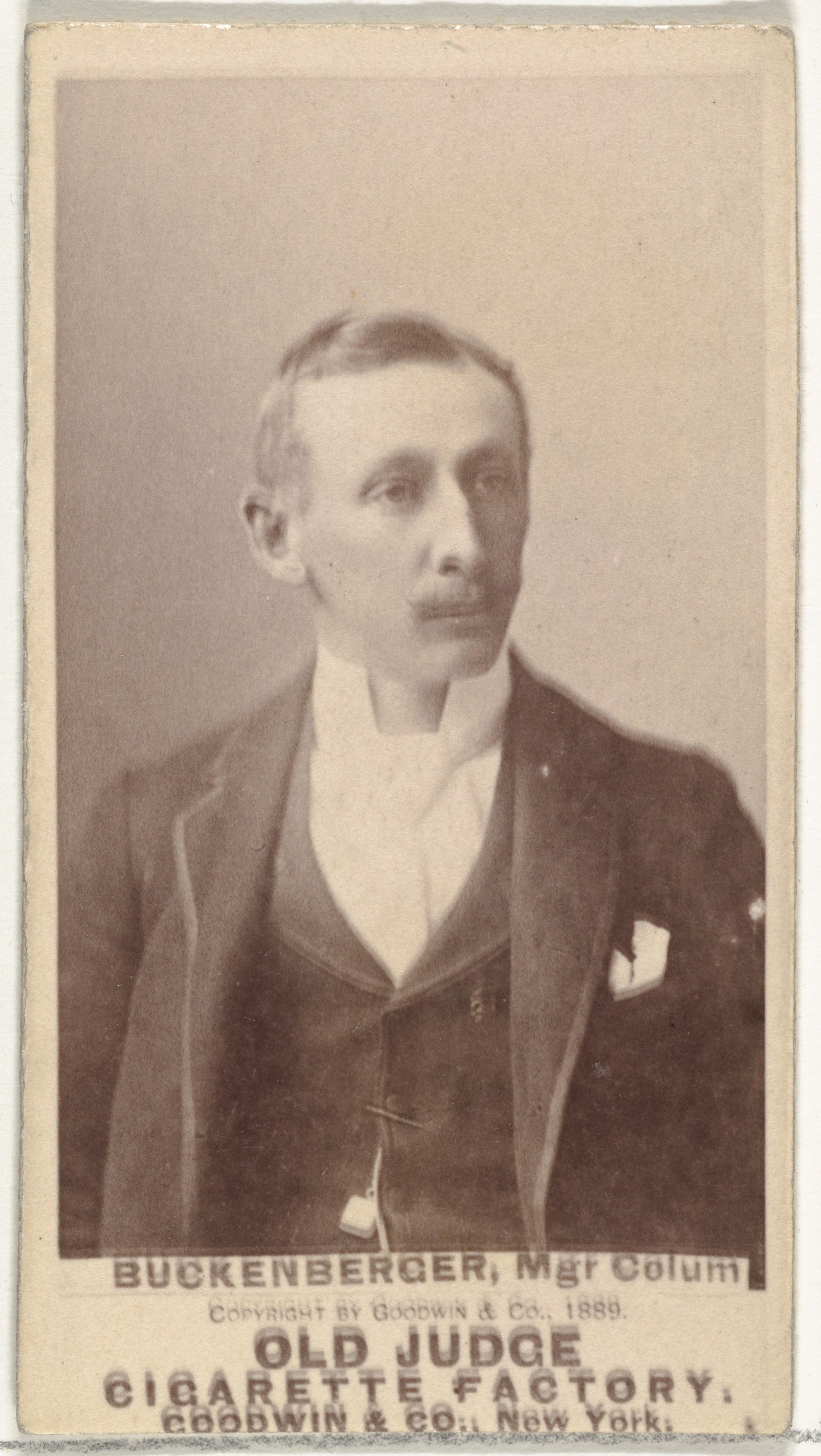
(1889) Al Buckenberger, Manager, Columbus Solons. baseball card. Buckenberger managed Sioux City to the league championship in 1891. He became manager of the Pittsburgh Pirates in 1892.

The Sioux City Corn Huskers captured the 1891 Western Association championship, led by manager Al Buckenberger. The league continued play as an eight-team league, but after a tumultuous season, it ended the season playing with four teams. On June 8, 1891, the St. Paul Apostles moved to become the Duluth Whalebacks. Then, On August 18, 1891, the first place Milwaukee Brewers (1886–1892) left the league and joined the major league American Association. This was followed immediately by the Duluth, Minneapolis Millers and Lincoln Rustlers teams folding August 20, 1891. The remaining Sioux City Cornhuskers, Kansas City Blues, Omaha Lambs and Denver Mountaineers teams did not fold, and the Western Association finished the season playing as a four-team league.

In the final standings with the four remaining teams, Sioux City won the title while finishing just 1.0 game ahead of the second place Kansas City Blues in a close pennant race. The Cornhuskers finished with a final record of 66-57 (.537) and Kansas City finished with a record of 66-59 (.528). No playoff was held following the season.

Frank Genins played for Sioux City from 1889 to 1891, primarily in centerfield. He would return to play for Sioux City in 1894. Genins also played shortstop and third base for Sioux City in 1891, committing 46 total errors while batting .231 with 23 stolen bases at age 24. Genins made his major league debut in 1892, playing with both the Cincinnati Reds and St. Louis Browns during the season.

Cornhuskers pitcher Bill Hart had a league leading 25-win season. Hard compiled his 25 wins while throwing 397 innings for Sioux City in 1891, with a 1.74 ERA at age 25. Hart would return to Sioux City for the 1894 season. Hart had pitched for the St. Louis Browns in the 1890 season, compiling a 12–8 record in his only major league season. Hart had one home run as a hitter for St. Louis.

Shortstop Frank Scheibeck played for Sioux City in 1891 at age 26, batting .250 in 122 games with the Corn Huskers. Scheibeck had a lengthy major league career. He had played with the Cleveland Blues (1887), Detroit Wolverines (1888) and Toledo Maumees (1890) prior to his season with the Corn Huskers. The then returned to the majors following his Sioux City season, playing with the Pittsburgh Pirates (1894), Washington Senators (1894–1895, 1899), Cleveland Blues (1901) and Detroit Tigers (1906).

At age 32, outfielder Ed Swartwood played for Sioux City in 1891, batting .286 with 5 home runs in 111 games. Swartwood joined Sioux City in 1891 after having been released by the Toledo Maumees, where he had been teammates with Frank Scheibeck. Swartwood was a career .300 career hitter in the major leagues. Prior to joining Sioux City, Swartwood played for the Buffalo Bisons (1881), Pittsburgh Alleghenys (1882–84), Brooklyn Grays (1885–87) and Toledo Maumees (1890) and won the batting championship of American Association in 1883, hitting .357. Following his 1891 season with Sioux City, Swartwood played for the Pittsburgh Pirates in 1892, where he played again for manager Al Buckenberger. After his playing career ended, Swartwood became an umpire. He first umpired in the major leagues in 1894 and then again from 1898 through 1900, working a total of 429 games. Swartwood ejected Cincinnati Reds manager Charles Comiskey from a game on June 5, 1894. Large in stature, Swartwood became the deputy sheriff of Allegheny County, working in the Hill District of Pittsburgh, Pennsylvania. With his law enforcement position, he also assisted in legal executions in the region in the era.

=== 1891: Post season series against Chicago & St. Louis ===
Immediately following the completion of their 1891 Western Association championship season, Sioux City hosted two exhibition series against major league teams. The Corn Huskers won both of the series. The first was against the Chicago Orphans (Today's Chicago Cubs), as Sioux City won four of six games against Chicago and player manager Cap Anson. On Monday October 5, 1891, Sioux City defeated Chicago 8–1. On October 6, 1891, Chicago defeated Sioux City 7–4. On Wednesday October 7, 1891, Chicago won their second game of the series in defeating Sioux City 9–6. Sioux City then won the next three games beginning with a 4–3 win over Chicago on Thursday October 8, 1891. On Friday October 9, 1891, Sioux City shut out Chicago 3–0. Sioux City won the series on Saturday October 10, 1891, with a 6–4 victory over the Chicago Orphans.

Shortly after the exhibition series against Chicago, Sioux City next hosted a series against the St. Louis Browns and Sioux City swept the series in four games. On Wednesday October 14, 1891, the series began with a 10–1 Sioux City victory over St. Louis. On Thursday October 15, 1891, Sioux City won the second game over St. Louis 9–4. The final two games were very high scoring. On Saturday October 17, 1891, Sioux City won the third game in beating St. Louis 19–12. In the final game of the series on Sunday October 18, 1891, Sioux City won by the score of 11–0 to complete the sweep of the St. Louis Browns.

Following his 1891 championship season with Sioux City, Corn Huskers manager Al Buckenberger became manager of the Pittsburgh Pirates in 1892. Folling his Sioux City tenure, he managed in the major leagues with the Pittsburgh Pirates (1892–1894), St. Louis Browns (1895) and Boston Beaneaters (1902–1904).

The Western Association did not return to play in 1892 due to financial shortcomings. There was also a major flood in Sioux City in May 1892, and the team did not return to play in any league that season. The Floyd River Flood killed 25 people and left 3,000 homeless.

=== 1894: Western League championship ===
On November 20, 1893, at a meeting in Indianapolis, Indiana, the Western League was reformed. Baseball Hall of Fame member Ban Johnson was named president of the league, beginning a tenure of leadership that saw the league evolve into a major league, eventually becoming the 1900 American League. Cincinnati, Ohio, where Johnson had been a local sports editor was briefly the league headquarters before the league became based in Chicago, Illinois. Johnson was selected as league president strengthened with public support of Charles Comiskey, then manager of the Cincinnati Reds.

The Sioux City Cornhuskers became charter members, joined by the Detroit Creams, Grand Rapids Rippers, Indianapolis Hoosiers, Kansas City Blues, Milwaukee Brewers, Minneapolis Millers, and Toledo White Stockings teams forming the Class A level league.

Sioux City won the 1894 Western League championship. The team was managed to their title by Bill Watkins, who was strictly a manager at age 37. The Cornhuskers ended the season with a 74–52 record in the final standings, finishing 8½ games ahead of the second place Toledo White Stockings. Two Cornhusker pitchers combined for 63 wins as Bert Cunningham had a record of 35-20 and his teammate Bill Hart finished 28–15. George Hogreiver had 27 triples on the season to lead the Western League.

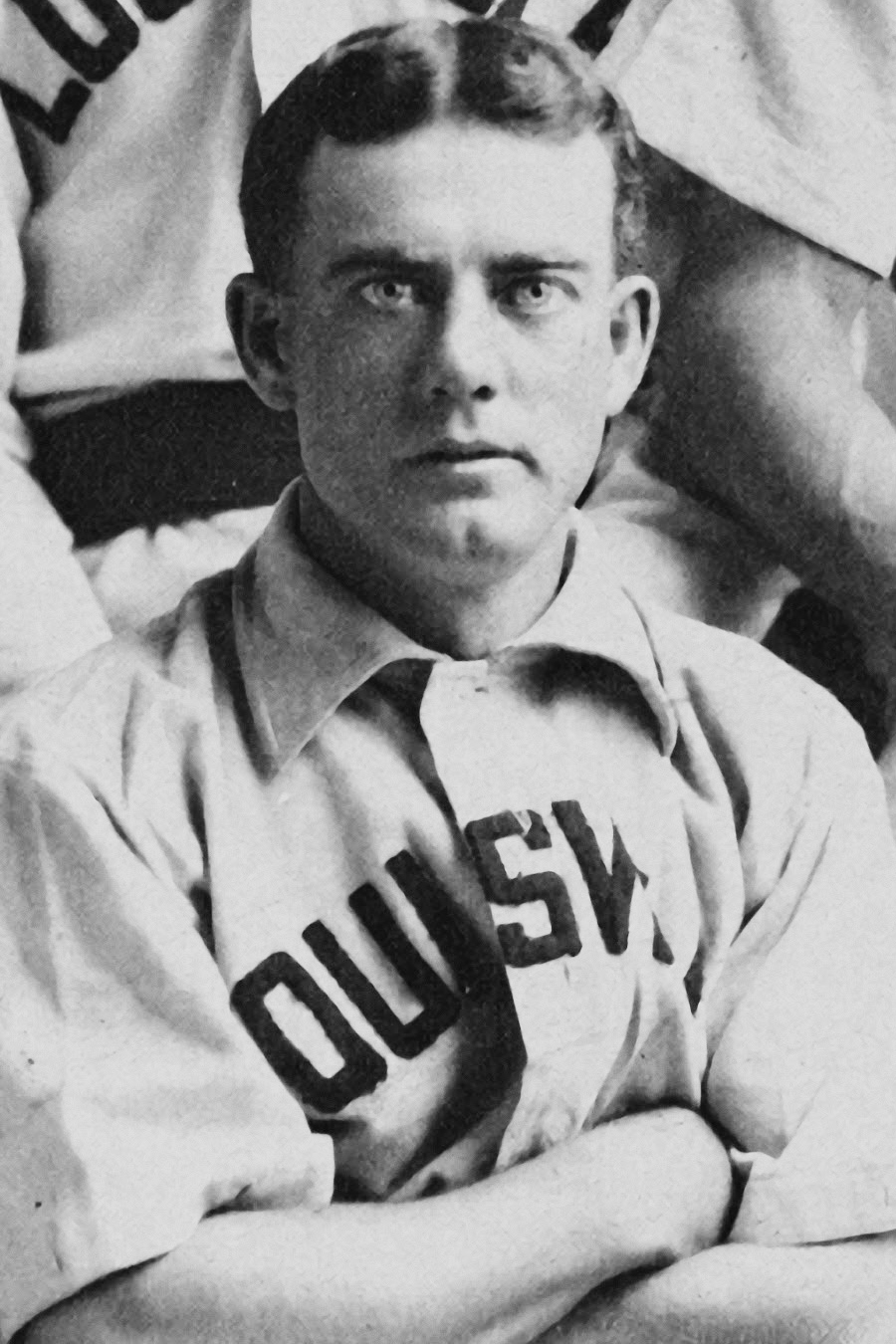
(1897) Bert Cunningham, Louisville Colonels. Cunningham won 35 games for the champion Sioux City team in 1894, pitching 455 innings. He pitched 11 seasons in the major leagues, winning 142 games.

After his strong 1894 season with Sioux City at age 28 in which he compiled 455 innings and allowed 632 hits in 55 games, Bert Cunningham began a five-season tenure with the major league Louisville Colonels in 1895. Cunningham had previously pitched five major league seasons prior to his season with the Cornhuskers. In his major league career pitching for the Brooklyn Grays (1887), Baltimore Orioles (1888–1889), Philadelphia Athletics (1890), Buffalo Bisons (1890), Baltimore Orioles (1891), Louisville Colonels (1895–1899) and Chicago Orphans (1900–1901), Cunningham won 142 games. Cunningham also hit 9 home runs with 124 RBIs in the major leagues.

Pitcher Bill Hart had a 28-win season throwing 398 innings for Sioux Falls in 1894 at age 28. He began his major league career the next season. Hart won 66 major league games pitching for the Philadelphia Athletics (1886–1887), Brooklyn Grooms (1892), Pittsburgh Pirates (1895, St. Louis Browns (1896–1897), Pittsburgh Pirates (1898) and Cleveland Blues (1901). Having begun his minor league career in 1885, Hart continued pitching professionally through 1910, when pitched in 12 games for the Chattanooga Lookouts at 44 years of age.

Frank Genins returned to play for Sioux City in 1894, batting .374 with 15 triples and 86 stolen bases. The media said of Genins, "one of the most reliable and conscientious men who ever wore a uniform. He is… a brilliant outfielder." Including Genins, the 1894 Corn Huskers team had 11 players who batted .300 or better on the season, each receiving over 100 at-bats.

After the 1894 season, the Sioux City Cornhuskers were unable to defend their Western League championship in Sioux City. Charles Comiskey left his position as the manager of the Cincinnati Reds, purchased the Sioux City, Iowa franchise and transferred it to St. Paul, Minnesota, with St. Paul joining the Western League. The relationship between Comiskey and Western League president Ban Johnson was a foundation of the forming of the American League five years after the Sioux City move to St. Paul.

=== 1895: Charles Comiskey / Sioux City moved to St. Paul ===
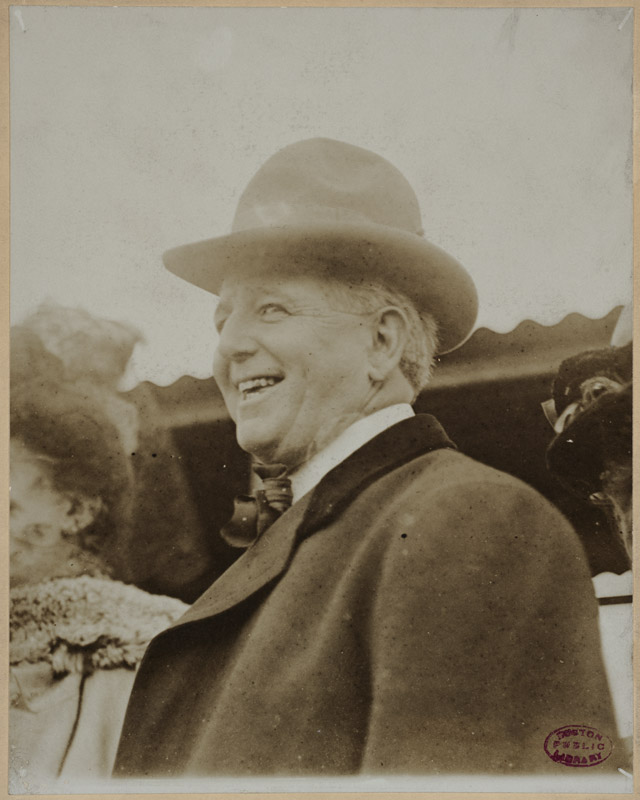
(1910) Baseball Hall of Fame member Charles Comiskey. Following his major league playing and managerial career, Comiskey bought the Sioux City Cornhuskers in 1894 and moved the team to St. Paul. In 1900, he moved the St. Paul Saints to Chicago to become the Chicago White Sox.

Charles Comiskey was a native of Chicago, Illinois, who began his major league playing career with the 1882 St. Louis Brown Stockings (today's St. Louis Cardinals). Comiskey was a player/manager for St. Louis during parts of his first three seasons before he became the Brown Stockings' full-time manager in 1885. From 1885 to 1888, Comiskey led the Brown Stockings to four consecutive American Association championships in his managerial tenure. Comisky left St. Louis and became the manager of the Cincinnati Reds beginning in 1891.

With his tenure as the Cincinnati Reds ended following the 1894 season, Charles Comiskey bought the Sioux City Cornhuskers franchise and relocated the team to become the St. Paul Saints for the 1895 Western League season. Comiskey both owned and managed the team, eventually building a new ballpark in St. Paul, Minnesota, which he also owned. Sioux City was left without a team despite having just won the championship of the 1894 Western League.

Once Sioux City was relocated and became based in St. Paul, the St. Paul Saints remained in the eight-team Western League. The relocated St. Paul Saints joined with the Detroit Tigers, Grand Rapids Gold Bugs, Indianapolis Hoosiers, Kansas City Blues, Milwaukee Brewers, Minneapolis Millers and Toledo Swamp Angels teams in forming the 1895 Western League. The other seven league members were all returning members of the 1894 league. The Indianapolis Hoosiers team finished in first place in 1895, managed by 1894 Sioux City manager Bill Watkins, who won his second consecutive league championship.

=== 1900: New leagues established ===
After a five-season hiatus, Sioux City resumed minor league play in 1900.

In 1900, Sioux City's former league, the Western League, changed its name to the American League. The league was attempting receive major league status under president Ban Johnson. The 1900 American League was unsuccessful in this attempt and played the 1900 season as a minor league. In 1900, with the approval of Western League president Ban Johnson and without resistance from the National League, Charles Comiskey moved the St. Paul Saints to the Armour Square area of Chicago where they became the Chicago White Stockings. The White Stockings won the 1900 American League pennant as the league played a final season as a minor league.

A new Western League formed as a Class B level league in 1900, with the Sioux City Cornhuskers joining the league. Charter members of the new Western League were the Denver Grizzlies, Des Moines Hawkeyes, Omaha Omahogs, Pueblo Indians, the new Sioux City Cornhuskers team and the St. Joseph Saints.

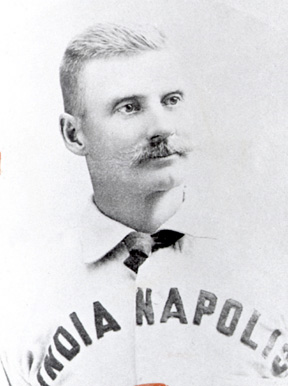
(1889) Jack Glasscock, Indianapolis Hoosiers. Glasscock managed Sioux City in 1900.

Shortstop Jack Glasscock managed the Sioux City Cornhuskers in their return to play in 1900. As a player, Glasscock won the 1890 batting title with a .336 average for the New York Giants and he led the major leagues in hits twice. He was the sixth major league player ever to accumulate 2,000 career hits. Glasscock ended his career holding major league records for games played (1,628), putouts (2,821), assists (5,630), total chances (9,283), double plays (620) and fielding percentage (.910) at shortstop and he ranked fifth overall in major league history in games with 1,736. Glasscock has been credited as the originator of the Charley horse terminology.

The Sioux City Cornhuskers ended the season with a record of 49-18 playing under managers Jack Glasscock, Ernie Beam, A.B. Deal and Hi Ebright. Despite the numerous managerial changes during the season, Sioux City ended the season in a respectable third place, finishing 8.0 games behind the first place Denver Grizzlies in the final standings of the six-team league.

Sioux City was replaced in the 1901 Western League, which expanded to become an eight-team league. The league continued play as the Pueblo Indians and Sioux City Cornhuskers teams both folded and were replaced by the Colorado Springs Millionaires and St. Paul Saints teams the league. The Kansas City Blues and Minneapolis Millers teams moved from the American League after those franchises were removed from the league in transition of becoming a major league.

The Chicago White Stockings became one of the American League's eight charter franchises when the league gained major league status in 1901 creating a franchise link between Sioux City and the major league team that continues play today.

=== 1902: Iowa South Dakota League ===
Sioux City returned to minor league play in 1902, becoming charter members of a newly formed league. The Iowa–South Dakota League began the season as a five-team league in its first season. The Sioux City Cornhuskers joined with the Le Mars Blackbirds, Rock Rapids Browns, Sheldon, and Sioux Falls Canaries teams. Sioux Falls became the first professional team in South Dakota and a Flandreau, South Dakota based team followed.

The Iowa–South Dakota League was formed with some controversy. In the meeting to officially form the league, W.E. Lockhart of Sioux City was nominated as president of the league as was Frank Koob of LeMars, Iowa. Flandreau cast a deciding vote for Koob. After the vote was taken, the Sioux City representatives left the meeting, threatening to leave the league and the Sioux Falls representatives followed. Flandreau also walked out. The remaining cities left in the meeting discussed organize a league themselves. At a later date, the six cities reconvened and Lockhart was elected president. The National Association sent Lockhart an invitation for the league to join them. The association classified the Iowa–South Dakota League as a Class D level league. Under the guidelines of the association, Class D level leagues were capped at a total salary of $900 per month. After the league schedule was set, the Flandreau franchise stated that they could not begin play until June 20. The other members allowed Flandreau the delay and it was agreed to give the team a .500 record when they began play on June 20.

The Class D level league began play on May 27, 1902. After the season began, the Flandreau Indians team joined the league as planned on June 20, and the team was given a record of 9–9 to begin play. The league played the remainder of the season as a six-team league. During the 1902 season, Sioux City angered other league members when the franchise discussed rejoining the Western League.

First baseman Jack Messerly became the Sioux City player/manager at age 29. Messerly also played in 86 games for the Cornhuskers. The Cornhuskers ended the season in third place in the overall standings. 56–40 record as Jack Messerly managed the team all season. Flandreau won the second half of the split season scheduled but the Indians folded before a playoff against Sioux Falls could be held. The Sioux Falls Canaries won the league title finishing 12½ games ahead of Sioux City and 4½ over second place Flandreau.

Sioux City's left-handed hitter Moose Baxter led the Iowa–South Dakota League in home runs with 21. He also scored a league leading 63 runs on the season. Baxter later played briefly in the major leagues with 21 at bats for the 1907 St. Louis Cardinals.

In 1903, manager Jack Messerly left Sioux City to play in the Pacific National League with the Los Angeles team. Sioux City continued membership in the final season of the Iowa-South Dakota League, as the team began a tenure of play becoming known as the Sioux City Soos.

== The ballparks ==
The Sioux City Corn Huskers teams hosted minor league home games at the Evans Driving Park Baseball Grounds. The ballpark was located in the center of the Evans Driving Park Racetrack. The ballpark site was just south of today's Crescent Park area of Sioux City.

In 1900, the Sioux City Cornhuskers began hosting minor league home games at the Riverside Baseball Grounds. The park was used for minor league games through 1918. The ballpark site was located at Riverside Boulevard & War Eagle Drive in Sioux City. Today, the site is home to Riverside Park, which contains ballfields and other amenities. The site was first home to an amusement park and hosted the Interstate Fair from 1903 to 1926. The Riverside Park address in 1301 Riverside Boulevard in Sioux City, Iowa.

== Timeline ==
Year(s)	# Yrs.	Team	Level	League	Ballpark
1888–1891	4	Sioux City Corn Huskers	Independent	Western Association	Evans Driving Park; Baseball Grounds
1894	1	Sioux City Cornhuskers	Class A	Western League	Evans Driving Park; Baseball Grounds
1900	1	Sioux City Cornhuskers	Class A	Western League II	Riverside Baseball Grounds
1902	1	Sioux City Cornhuskers	Class D	Iowa-South Dakota League	Riverside Baseball Grounds

== Year-by-year records ==
Year	Record	Finish	Manager	Playoffs / notes
1888	21–38	--	Will Bryan / Jim Powell	Team began play July 4. Disbanded
1889	59–61	4th	Jim Powell	No playoffs held
1890	55–64	5th	Jim Powell	No playoffs held
1891	66–57	1st	Al Buckenberger	League champions No playoffs held
1894	74–52	1st	Bill Watkins	League champions No playoffs held
1900	49–48	3rd	Jack Glasscock / Ernie Beam; A.B. Deal / Hi Ebright	No playoffs held
1902	56–40	3rd	Jack Messerly	No playoffs held

== Notable alumni ==
- Ollie Anderson (1902)
- Moose Baxter (1902)
- Ernie Beam (1900, MGR)
- Charlie Bell (baseball) (1890–1891)
- Harry Berte (1900)
- Bob Black (1889, 1891 1902)
- Eddie Boyle (1894)
- George Bradley (1889)
- Roy Brashear (1900)
- Buttons Briggs (1900)
- Al Buckenberger (1891, MGR)
- Bill Burdick (1889)
- Kid Camp (1894)
- Lew Camp (1894, 1900)
- Monk Cline (1889)
- Henry Cote (1900)
- Joe Crotty (1889)
- Billy Crowell (1889)
- Bert Cunningham (1894)
- Jim Devlin (pitcher) (1890
- Charlie Dewald (1891)
- Billy Earle (1891)
- Hi Ebright (1900, MGR)
- Red Ehret (1891)
- Davy Force (1888)
- Charlie Ferguson (1900)
- Bill Geiss (1888)
- Frank Genins (1888–1891, 1894)
- Jack Glasscock (1900, MGR)
- Ed Glenn (1889)
- Bill Hallman (1900)
- Billy Hart (1891, 1894)
- Tony Hellman (1889)
- Hardie Henderson (1890)
- George Hogreiver (1894)
- Lefty Houtz (1900)
- Bumpus Jones (1894)
- Heinie Kappel (1890
- Jack Keenan (1900)
- Henry Killeen (1894)
- Gus Krock (1891)
- Lefty Marr (1894)
- Al McCauley (1894)
- Walter McCredie (1900)
- Jim McLaughlin (1888)
- George Meakim (1891)
- George Moolic (1888)
- Bill Moriarty (1902)
- Tom Morrissey (1891)
- Danny Murphy (1889)
- John Newell (1894)
- Parson Nicholson (1891)
- Bill Niles (1900)
- Billy O'Brien (1891, 1894)
- Tim O'Rourke (1894)
- Frank Pears (1894)
- Dick Phelan (1888)
- Tom Poorman (1891)
- Jim Powell (1888–1890, MGR)
- Fred Raymer (1900)
- Harry Raymond (1891)
- Phil Reccius (1888)
- Frank Roth (1900)
- Frank Scheibeck (1891)
- Al Schellhase (1890
- John Sneed (1888)
- Joe Strauss (1891)
- Ace Stewart (1894)
- Ed Swartwood (1891)
- Art Twineham (1894)
- Bill Van Dyke (1891)
- Peek-A-Boo Veach (1888)
- Joe Walsh (1894)
- Bill Watkins (1894, MGR)
- Guerdon Whiteley (1888)
- Wild Bill Widner (1891)

== See also ==
- Sioux City Corn Huskers players players
- Sioux City Cornhuskers players
