= Flandreau Indians =

- 1902; Flandreau, South Dakota

Minor league affiliations
- Class: Class D (1902)
- League: Iowa-South Dakota League (1902)

Major league affiliations
- Team: None

Minor league titles
- League titles (0): None
- Conference titles (1): 1902

Team data
- Name: Flandreau Indians (1902)
- Ballpark: Flandreau Park (1902)

The Flandreau Indians were a minor league baseball team based in Flandreau, South Dakota. In 1902, Flandreau played as member of the Class D level Iowa-South Dakota League, winning a split–season title before disbanding. The Indians hosted minor league home games at Flandreau Park.

== History ==
The 1902 Flandreau Indians became charter members of the six–team Iowa-South Dakota League. The Iowa-South Dakota League was formed as a Class D level League and Flandreau joined the league on June 20, 1903, after the season had begun. The president of the Iowa–South Dakota League was J.U. Sammis, an attorney who practiced and resided in Le Mars, Iowa. Flandreau joined the Le Mars Blackbirds, Rock Rapids Browns, Sheldon, Sioux City Cornhuskers and Sioux Falls Canaries as charter Iowa-South Dakota League members.

In their first season of play, the Flandreau Indians joined the league on June 20, 1902, playing under player/manager Arthur Hillebrand, who also served as a college football and baseball coach while managing Flandeau. The Indians were given a record of 9–9 to begin the season, which made its overall first–half record 31–22 (22–13 in actual games played). Flandreau won the second–half title with a 29–6 record. Flandreau placed second in the 1902 Iowa–South Dakota League overall standings, but won the second split–season title. The overall standings featured the first place Sioux Falls Canaries (65–24), followed by the Flandreau Indians (51–19), Sioux City Cornhuskers (56–40), Le Mars Blackbirds (43–48), Rock Rapids Browns 39–52 and Sheldon (14–71).

The Sioux Falls Canaries won the first–half championship. After Flandreau won the second–half title, the Flandreau Indians were unable to continue the team for the playoff against Sioux Falls.

Johnny Dorman of Flandreau won the 1902 Iowa-South Dakota League batting title with a batting average of .314, while Dan Stearns ended a lengthy playing career with the team at age 41. Manager Art Hillebrand and his brother Homer Hillebrand played together for the 1902 Indians. Art Hillebrand was a college football and baseball coach while serving as player/manager for the Flandreau Indians. Art coached at Navy and Princeton, winning the 1903 Football National Championship at Princeton. Flandreau player Ralph Hutchinson played college football at Princeton with Hillebrand. Art Hillebrand was inducted into the College Football Hall of Fame in 1970.

At the May 1903 organizational meeting for the second season of the Class D level Iowa–South Dakota League, the Flandreau franchise did not send a representative and the franchise folded. At the meeting, the Sioux Falls franchise was represented by Charles Craig, LeMars by Bobby Black, Sioux City by Dr. George B. Wood, Charles Hughson and Frank E. Lohr. Flandreau, Rock Rapids and Sheldon did not send a representative. The Council Bluffs Bluffers franchise was selected as a replacement city, represented at the meeting by Buck Keith and Frank Wilson.

Flandreau, South Dakota has not hosted another minor league team.

Today, the Flandreau Cardinals amateur team plays home games at Flandreau Park.

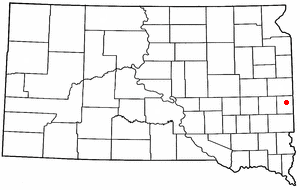
Map location. Flandreau, South Dakota.

== The ballpark ==
The Flandreau Indians were noted to have played 1902 minor league home games at Flandreau Park. Originally called Riverside Park, Flandreau Park is still in use today as a public park with ballfields and amenities.

Today, the park still hosts baseball at the ballpark, serving as the home plays host of the Flandreau Cardinals amateur baseball team. Flandreau Park is located at 22974 Flandreau Park Road in Flandreau, South Dakota.

== Year–by–year record ==
Year	Record	Finish	Manager	Playoffs/Notes
1902	51–16	2nd	Art Hillebrand	Won 2nd half title Did not field a team for playoff

== Notable alumni ==
- Art Hillebrand (1902, MGR) College Football Hall of Fame
- Bill Carney (1902)
- Homer Hillebrand (1902)
- Ralph Hutchinson (1902)
- Rudy Kling (1902)
- Dan Stearns (1902)
- Flandreau Indians players
