= Iowa–South Dakota League =

- Classification: Class D (1902–1903)
- Sport: Minor League Baseball
- First season: 1902
- Folded: 1903
- President: W.E. Lockhart (1902); J. U. Sammism (1903)
- No. of teams: 8
- Country: United States of America
- Most titles: 1 Sioux Falls Canaries (1902); Le Mars Blackbirds (1903)
- Related competitions: Iowa State League

The Iowa–South Dakota League was a minor league baseball circuit that operated from 1902 to 1903 in the states of Iowa and South Dakota. The league was a Class D level league in both seasons. The Sioux Falls Canaries (1902) and Le Mars Blackbirds (1903) won the league championships.

== History ==
The Iowa–South Dakota League contained six teams in its inaugural season, before being reduced to three in the final season. The Flandreau Indians, Le Mars Blackbirds, Rock Rapids Browns, Sheldon, Sioux City Cornhuskers and Sioux Falls Canaries were the charter members in 1902.

The Sioux Falls Canaries won the championship in 1902, with the Le Mars Blackbirds capturing the 1903 Iowa–South Dakota League final championship.

The 1903 president of the Iowa–South Dakota League was J. U. Sammism, a Le Mars, Iowa attorney.

== Cities represented ==
- Council Bluffs, Iowa: Council Bluffs Bluffers (1903)
- Flandreau, South Dakota: Flandreau Indians (1902)
- Le Mars, Iowa: Le Mars Blackbirds (1902–1903)
- Rock Rapids, Iowa: Rock Rapids Browns (1902)
- Sheldon, Iowa: Sheldon (1902)
- Sheldon, Iowa and Primghar, Iowa: Sheldon-Primghar Hyphens (1903)
- Sioux City, Iowa: Sioux City Cornhuskers 1902; Sioux City Soos (1903)
- Sioux Falls, South Dakota: Sioux Falls Canaries (1902–1903)

== Standings & statistics ==
1902 Iowa–South Dakota League
schedule

Team standings	W	L	PCT	GB	Managers
Sioux Falls Canaries	65	24	.730	–	Bobby Warner
Flandreau Indians	51	19	.729	4½	NA
Sioux City Cornhuskers	56	40	.583	12½	Jack Messerly
Le Mars Blackbirds	43	48	.473	23	Bob Black
Rock Rapids Browns	32	59	.352	34	Grandpa Greene
Sheldon	14	71	.165	49	NA

Flandreau joined on June 20, and was awarded a record of (9–9), which made its overall first-half record 31–22.
Flandreau won the second half and folded before the playoff against Sioux Falls.

Player statistics
Player	Team	Stat	Tot	Player	Team	Stat	Tot
John Dorman	Flandreau	BA	.314	Harry Swalm	Sioux Falls	W	23
Moose Baxter	Sioux City	Runs	63	Jack Corbett	Sioux Falls	Pct	.882; 15–2
Moose Baxter	Sioux City	HR	21				

1903 Iowa–South Dakota League

Team standings	W	L	PCT	GB	Managers
Le Mars Blackbirds	48	34	.585	–	Bob Black
Council Bluffs Bluffers / Sheldon-Primghar Hyphens	44	35	.557	2½	Buck Keith / John McBurney / Bud Jones
Sioux City Soos	44	41	.518	5½	Frank Lohr
Sioux Falls Canaries	40	42	.488	8	Bobby Warner

Council Bluffs folded on June 20 with a record of 1–22. On June 25, Council Bluffs transferred to Sheldon–Primghar, which was awarded a record of 14–11.

Player statistics
Player	Team	Stat	Tot	Player	Team	Stat	Tot
Tony Fremmer	Sheld-Prim	BA	.325	Fred Helmsdorfer	Sheld-Prim	W	19
Frank Lohr	Sioux City	Runs	62	Ralph Hutchinson	LeMars	Pct	.909; 10–1
Jim Metcalf	LeMars	Hits	100				

== MLB alumni ==
- Bob Black (Cornhuskers/Sioux)
- George Bristow (Blackbirds)
- Jim Buchanan (Blackbirds)
- Fred Carisch (Canaries)
- Bill Carney (Indians)
- Homer Hillebrand (Indians)
- Pete Lister (Blackbirds)
- Bill Moriarty (Cornhuskers)
- Peaches O'Neill (Blackbirds)
- Branch Rickey (Blackbirds)
- Shag Shaughnessy (Soos)
- Dan Stearns (Indians)
- Babe Towne (Browns)

== References/Sources ==
- Johnson, Lloyd; Wolff, Miles (2007). The Encyclopedia of Minor League Baseball. Baseball America (Third edition). ISBN 978-1-93-239117-6
- Baseball Reference – Iowa-South Dakota League (D) Encyclopedia and History
