= Frank Genins =

American baseball player (1866–1922)

- Outfielder/Infielder
- Born: November 2, 1866; St. Louis, Missouri, U.S.
- Died: September 30, 1922 (aged 55); St. Louis, Missouri, U.S.
- Batted: Unknown Threw: Right

MLB debut
- July 5, 1892, for the Cincinnati Reds

Last MLB appearance
- May 23, 1901, for the Cleveland Blues

MLB statistics
- Batting average: .226
- Hits: 116
- Stolen bases: 37
- Stats at Baseball Reference

Teams
- Cincinnati Reds (1892); St. Louis Browns (1892); Pittsburgh Pirates (1895); Cleveland Blues (1901)

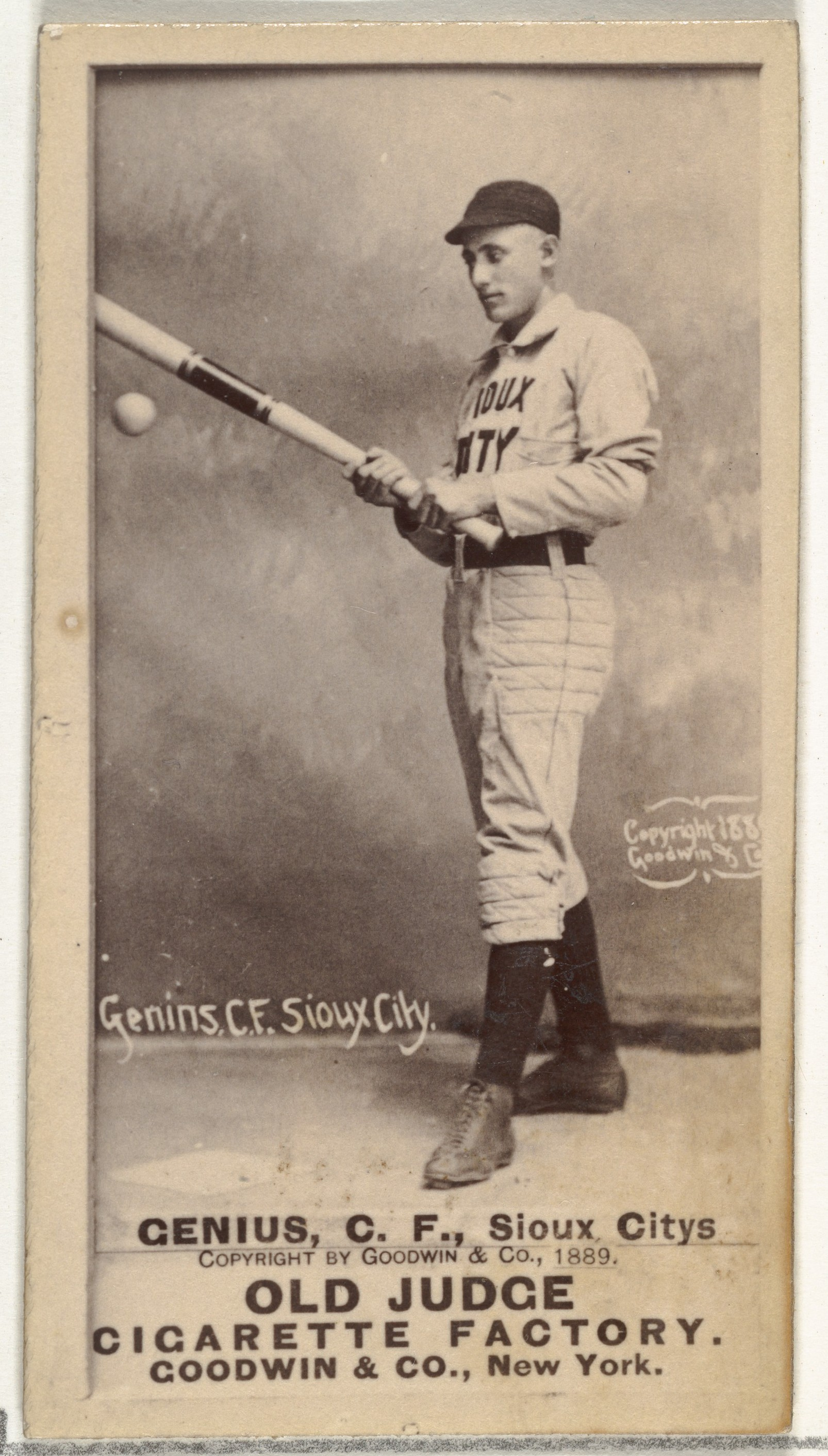
Frank Genins, 1889

C. Frank Genins (November 2, 1866 – September 30, 1922) was an American Major League Baseball utility player who played for three seasons. He played for the Cincinnati Reds and St. Louis Browns in 1892, the Pittsburgh Pirates in 1895, and the Cleveland Blues in 1901. His nickname was Frenchy.

Genins' minor league stints include the Omaha Omahogs in 1887 and 1901 through 1903, the Denver Mountain Lions in 1888, the Sioux City Cornhuskers from 1888 until 1891 and again in 1894, the Indianapolis Hoosiers in 1892, the Grand Rapids Goldbugs in 1896, the Columbus Buckeyes from 1896 until 1899, the Cleveland Lake Shores in 1900, The Oklahoma City Mets in 1905, the St. Joseph Packers in 1906, the Dubuque Dubs from 1907 until 1908 and the Racine Belles in 1909.

Genins managed the St. Joseph Packers in 1906, the Dubuque Dubs in 1907 and the Freeport Pretzels in 1909.
