= Council Bluffs Rails =

- 1903–1935; (1903, 1935); Council Bluffs, Iowa

Minor league affiliations
- Class: Class D (1903); Class A (1935)
- League: Iowa-South Dakota League (1903); Western League (1935)

Major league affiliations
- Team: None

Minor league titles
- League titles (0): None

Team data
- Name: Council Bluffs Bluffers (1903); Council Bluffs Rails (1935)
- Ballpark: Broadway Park (1935); Lake Manawa Ballpark (1903)

The Council Bluffs Rails were a minor league baseball team based in Council Bluffs, Iowa in 1935. Preceded by the 1903 Council Bluffs Bluffers, Council Bluffs teams played as members of the Class D level Iowa-South Dakota League in 1903 and Class A level Western League in 1935. Both Council Bluffs teams played partial seasons.

== History ==
In 1903, Council Bluffs, Iowa first hosted minor league baseball. In a May 1903 organizational meeting for the second season of the Class D level Iowa–South Dakota League, the Sioux Falls franchise was represented by C.H. Craig, LeMars by Bobby Black, Sioux City by Dr. George B. Wood, Charles Hughson and Frank E. Lohr. Sheldon did not send a representative and the Flandreau Indians and Rock Rapids Browns had left the league following the 1902 season. Council Bluffs was selected as a replacement city represented by Buck Keith and Frank Wilson. Keith also represented Onawa, Iowa, who applied for a franchise, but without a sixth league franchise, their application was not accepted. A league schedule was adopted which began play on May 21, 1903, and ended on Sept. 7, 1903.

The Council Bluffs Bluffers began play as members of the four–team Class D level Iowa–South Dakota League, along with the Le Mars Blackbirds, Sioux City Soos and Sioux Falls Canaries. The Council Bluffs team then relocated during the season. On June 20, 1903, the Council Bluffs Bluffers withdrew from the Iowa–South Dakota League after beginning the season with a record of 1–22. The team was transferred to Sheldon–Primghar, Iowa. The Sheldon–Primghar team was awarded a record of 14–11, when beginning play on June 25, 1903.

The newly named Sheldon-Primghar Hyphens ended the season with an overall record of 44–35, placing second in the 1903 Iowa–South Dakota League standings, finishing 2.5 games behind the champion Le Mars Blackbirds. John McBurney and Bud Jones were the 1903 managers in Sheldon after Buck Keith managed the team in Council Bluffs. The Iowa–South Dakota League permanently folded following the 1903 season. Sheldon and Pringhar have not hosted another minor league franchise.

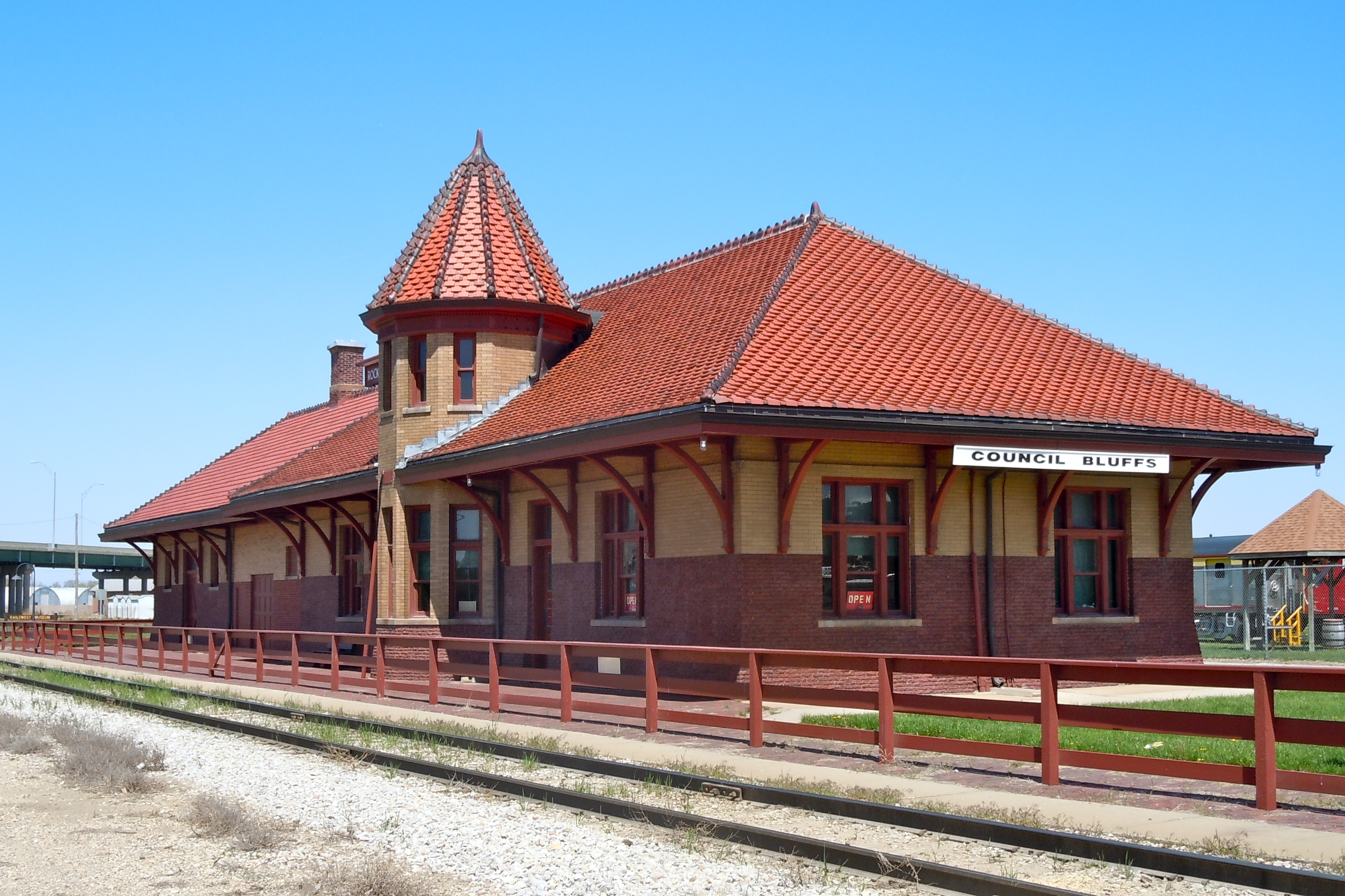
(2011) Railroad Station. Council Bluffs, Iowa

Minor league baseball returned to Council Bluffs during the 1935 season. In May 1935, the nearby Omaha Packers owners could not meet payroll for the Class A level Western League franchise after 35 years of play in the league. In the era, Class A was the highest level of the minor leagues and Omaha was playing with the Cedar Rapids Raiders, Davenport Blue Sox, Des Moines Demons, Keokuk Indians, Rock Island Islanders, Sioux City Cowboys and St. Joseph Saints as fellow league members in the eight–team league, which began play on May 7, 1935. In early June, 1935 the Omaha ownership did not have funds to support travel to an away game against the Rock Island Islanders. On June 7, 1935, the franchise was forfeited back to the Western League as Mrs. E.C. Branconier, the Omaha team owner, had not made player payroll since May 15, 1935. Team manager Joe McDermott was appointed to run the team by the Western League. Branconier had paid the lease for the Vinton Street Park in advance and refused to sell the lease back to the Western League. On June 25, 1935, the franchise relocated and became the Council Bluffs Rails.

Once the franchise became based in Council Bluffs, Iowa, the Western League paid back the player salaries as a loan against the club. Ad Liska became the franchise business manager and Joe McDermott remained as manager. Council Bluffs paid $3,500 to acquire the franchise, raising money by selling tickets for the 40 remaining home games. Single game tickets sold for 40 cents and the local Chamber sold ticket books. The Western League agreed to paying players' salaries and away game operating expenses for the rest of the year. These costs were added to the loan.

The Council Bluffs' Daily Nonpareil local newspaper held a contest to name the team. After receiving 1,100 entries, J. Vincent Crowe won the contest, and the team became known as the "Rails".

The first "Council Bluffs Rails" home game was on July 2, 1935, with 2,200 in attendance. The Rails had a 9–3 record in their first 12 games. Ad Liska, the business manager pitched for the Rails and had an 11–6 record. Liska acquired Frank Waddey from Chattanooga and Waddey hit .301 in 173 at-bats for the Rails.

With financial issues continuing, Ad Liska put up $1,000 of his personal money to keep the franchise alive, however Judge Branham ruled the Rails had to pay the delinquent back salaries, adding an additional $5,000 of debt. By August 20, 1935, the franchise needed $3,500 to complete the season schedule. On August 27, 1935, the players refused to travel to play the Des Moines Demons unless they were paid. The Western League released the entire Council Bluffs roster and declared the players as free agents. Council Bluffs disbanded.

Overall, the Omaha Packers/Council Bluffs Rails of the Western League ended the 1935 season with a record of 55–46. The team had a 22–15 record based in Omaha.

Council Bluffs, Iowa has not hosted another minor league team, except for the first two years of the Omaha Cardinals' existence (1947–1948) when the Cardinals played their home games at American Legion Park while awaiting construction of Municipal Stadium in Omaha.

== The ballparks ==
In 1903, the Council Bluffs Bluffers played their home games at a ballpark in or near Lake Manawa. The Bluffers' lone victory came in their home opener on May 27, as they defeated LeMars 5-4 in 10 innings.[Omaha Daily Bee, May 28, 1903, p. 4]

In 1935, the Council Bluffs Rails played their home games at Broadway Park, on the southeast corner of Broadway and 35th Street. The Rails' home opener came on July 2, defeating Sioux City 7-3.[Cedar Rapids Gazette, July 3, 1935, p. 10] The ballpark's property was later acquired by the American Legion and renamed American Legion Park.

== Timeline ==
Year(s)	# Yrs.	Team	Level	League
1903	1	Council Bluffs Bluffers	Class D	Iowa-South Dakota League
1935	1	Council Bluffs Rails	Class D	Western League

== Year–by–year records ==
Year	Record	Finish	Manager	Playoffs/Notes
1903	1–22	NA	Buck Keith / John McBurney / Bud Jones	Team disbanded June 20; Replaced by Sheldon-Primghar
1935	55–46	NA	Joe McDermott	Omaha Packers moved to Council Bluffs June 25; Team disbanded August 27

== Notable alumni ==
- Ad Liska (1935)
- Bob Loane (1935)
- Duke Sedgwick (1935)
- Frank Waddey (1935)

== See also ==
Council Bluffs Rails players
