= Art Hillebrand =

American football and baseball player and coach (1876–1941)

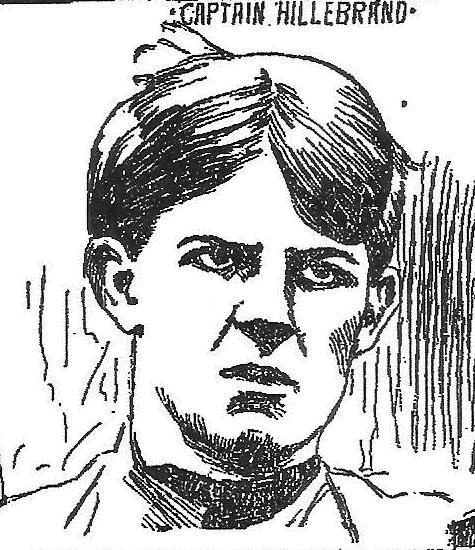

Biographical details
- Born: March 9, 1876; Freeport, Illinois, U.S.
- Died: December 14, 1941 (aged 65); Corvallis, Oregon, U.S.

Playing career

Football
- 1896–1899: Princeton

Baseball
- 1900: Princeton
- 1902: Flandreau Indians
- 1903: Los Angeles
- 1905: Plattsburgh
- 1906: Ottawa
- Position: Tackle (football)

Coaching career (HC unless noted)

Football
- 1901–1902: Navy
- 1903–1905: Princeton

Baseball
- 1901–1902: Navy
- 1903–1905: Princeton

Head coaching record
- Overall: 35–15–2 (football); 65–31 (baseball)

Accomplishments and honors

Championships
- Football; 1 national (1903)

Awards
- 2× Consensus All-American (1898, 1899); Third-team All-American (1897)
- College Football Hall of Fame; Inducted in 1970 (profile)

Arthur Ralph Thomas "Doc" Hillebrand (March 9, 1876 – December 14, 1941) was an American college football and college baseball player and coach. He played football as a tackle for Princeton University. Hillebrand served as head football coach at the United States Naval Academy from 1901 to 1902 and at his alma mater, Princeton, from 1903 to 1905, compiling a career college football head coaching record of 35–15–2. Hillebrand was the head baseball coach at Navy during the same years. He was inducted into the College Football Hall of Fame as player in 1970.

== Coaching career ==
Hillebrand was the ninth head football at the United States Naval Academy located in Annapolis, Maryland and he held that position for two seasons, from 1901 until 1902. His coaching record at Navy was 8–11–2.

== Family and death ==
Hillebrand was the brother of Homer Hillebrand, who also played baseball at Princeton and professionally with the Pittsburgh Pirates of Major League Baseball (MLB). Art was killed on December 14, 1941, in a fire that destroyed Homer's farm house in the northern part of Benton County, Oregon. Also killed in the fire were Homer's wife and younger son.

== Head coaching record ==
=== Football ===
Year	Team	Overall	Conference	Standing	Bowl/playoffs
Navy Midshipmen (Independent) (1901–1902)
1901	Navy	6–4–1			
1902	Navy	2–7–1			
Navy:		8–11–2			
Princeton Tigers (Independent) (1903–1905)
1903	Princeton	11–0			
1904	Princeton	8–2			
1905	Princeton	8–2			
Princeton:		27–4			
Total:		35–15–2			
National championship Conference title Conference division title or championship game berth
