= St. Louis Whites =

- 1888; St. Louis, Missouri

Minor league affiliations
- Class: Class A (1888)
- League: Western Association (1888)

Major league affiliations
- Team: St. Louis Browns

Minor league titles
- League titles: None

Team data
- Name: St. Louis Whites (1888)
- Ballpark: Sportsman's Park (1888)

The St. Louis Whites (or White Stockings) were a minor league baseball team based in St. Louis, Missouri. In 1888, the St. Louis "Whites" played briefly as members of the Class A level Western Association. The Whites were created as an early version of a farm team for the St. Louis Browns, who evolved to become today's St. Louis Cardinals.

The St. Louis Whites hosted their home games at Sportsman's Park.

Baseball Hall of Fame member Jake Beckley played for the St. Louis Whites and Hall of Famer Charles Comiskey was a 25% owner of the team.

== History ==
The St. Louis Whites team was founded by St. Louis Browns owner Chris Von der Ahe, who formed the Whites to serve as a farm team for the Browns. The new franchise joined the Class A level Western Association, the highest level of minor leagues in the era. Von der Ahe had signed no fewer than twenty–nine players to 1888 contracts for the Whites by December 1887. Von der Ahe owned 50% of the franchise, with Whites' manager Tom Loftus and St. Louis Browns player/manager Charlie Comiskey splitting the remaining 50% of the St. Louis Whites ownership.

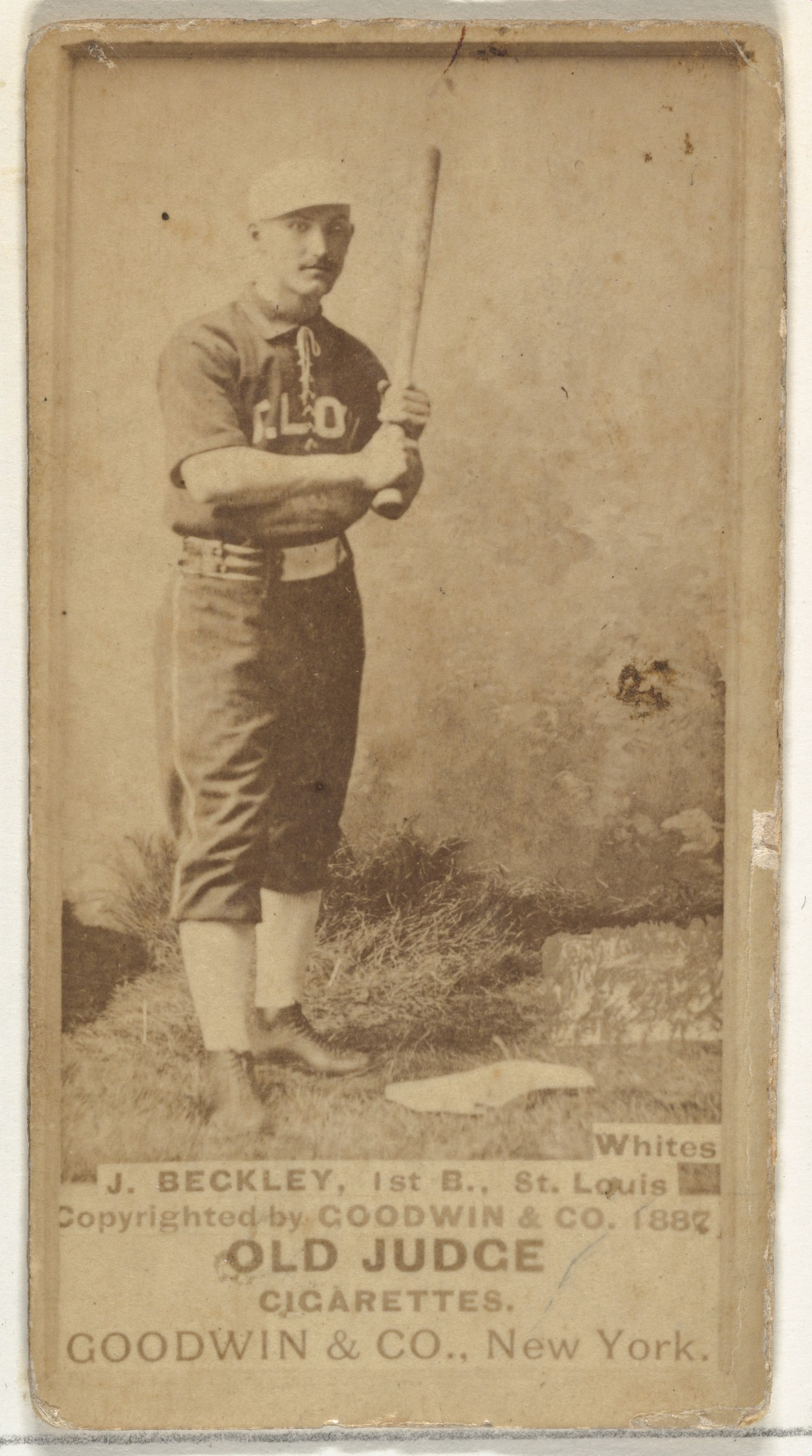
Baseball Hall of Fame member Jake Beckley, St. Louis Whites. Old Judge Cigarettes baseball card.

In the 1888 season, the newly formed St. Louis Whites began minor league play as members of the eight–team Class A level Western Association. The Whites joined with the Chicago Maroons, Des Moines Prohibitionists, Kansas City Blues, Milwaukee Brewers, Minneapolis Millers, Omaha Omahogs and St. Paul Apostles teams in Western Association league play.

The St. Louis Whites played their first exhibition game in a contest against the major league St. Louis Browns on March 25, 1888, at Sportsman's Park in St. Louis.

The Whites opened the season, beginning Western Association league play on April 28, 1888, playing against the Milwaukee Brewers at Sportsman's Park. The St. Louis Whites played their first 11 games at home, hosting home games when the St. Louis Browns played games on the road as to avoid conflicts. St. Louis later was soon forced to fold from the Western Association during the season, after the team owners sought to sell the franchise. On June 20, 1888, St. Louis disbanded with a record of 10–18, playing their partial season under manager Tom Loftus. After the team folded, their roster of players was sold off or transferred to other teams. The St. Louis franchise was eventually replaced in the Western Association play by the Sioux City Cornhuskers, who began play July 4, 1888, before that franchise folded on October 1, 1888.

Baseball Hall of Fame member Jake Beckley played for the 1888 St. Louis Whites. Playing for the team at age 20, Beckley batted .319 in 38 games for St, Louis, before making his major league debut after the Whites folded. Following the demise of the team, Beckley was purchased for $4,500 (along with Harry Staley) by the Pittsburgh Alleghenys midway through the 1888 season.

== The ballpark ==
The 1888 St. Louis Whites played their home games at Sportsman's Park, home of the St. Louis Browns. The ballpark was located at Grand Boulevard and Dodier Street, on the north side of St. Louis, later becoming home of the St. Louis Cardinals until 1966. The field portion of the ballpark is still in use today for youth activities.

== Year–by–year record ==
Year	Record	Finish	Manager	Playoffs/Notes
1888	18–44	NA	Tom Loftus	Team disbanded June 20

== Notable alumni ==
- Jake Beckley (1888), Inducted Baseball Hall of Fame, 1971
- Charles Comiskey (1888, part-owner) Inducted Baseball Hall of Fame, 1939
- Tug Arundel (1888)
- Ernie Burch (1888)
- Bart Cantz (1888)
- Jack Crooks (1888)
- Tom Dolan (1888)
- Pete Galligan (1888)
- Joseph Herr (1888)
- Hunkey Hines (1888)
- Parson Nicholson (1888)
- Harry Staley (1888)
- Chris von der Ahe (1888, owner)

== See also ==
- St. Louis Whites players
