= Sheldon-Primghar Hyphens =

- 1902–1903; Sheldon, Iowa

Minor league affiliations
- Class: Class D (1902–1903)
- League: Iowa-South Dakota League (1902–1903)

Major league affiliations
- Team: None

Minor league titles
- Class titles (0): None

Team data
- Name: Sheldon (1902); Sheldon–Primghar Hyphens (1903)
- Ballpark: Sheldon City Park (1902–1903)

The Sheldon–Primghar Hyphens were a minor league baseball team based in Sheldon, Iowa, in partnership with neighboring Primghar, Iowa. In 1902 and 1903, Sheldon teams played as members of the Class D level Iowa-South Dakota League. The combined team played as the "Hyphens" in 1903. Sheldon hosted home minor league home games at Sheldon City Park.

== History ==
The 1902 Sheldon team was the first minor league baseball team based in Sheldon, Iowa, when the "Sheldon" team became charter members of the six–team Iowa-South Dakota League. Sheldon finished the Iowa–South Dakota League regular season with a 14–71 record, placing last in the regular season standings, while playing the season under managers H.M. Moser, Mickie Jamison, Frank Albertson and Artie Ward. The Sheldon team hosted home minor league games at Sheldon City Park.

In their first season of play, Sheldon placed sixth in the 1902 Iowa-South Dakota League standings with their 14–71 record. Sheldon finished behind the Flandreau Indians (51–19), Le Mars Blackbirds (43–48), Rock Rapids Browns (32–59), Sioux City Cornhuskers (56–40) and the champion Sioux Falls Canaries (65–24). Sheldon finished 49.0 games behind Sioux Falls in the final standings.

The Sheldon franchise folded after the season, being replaced by the Council Bluffs Bluffers in beginning play in the 1903 the Iowa–South Dakota League. The Rock Rapids and Flandreau franchises also folded from the league following the 1902 season.

In 1903, after beginning the season without a minor league team, Sheldon regained a team in the four–team Iowa–South Dakota League during the season. On June 20, 1903, the Council Bluffs Bluffers withdrew from the Iowa–South Dakota League with a record of 1–22. The team was transferred to Sheldon–Primghar, as the franchise added neighboring Primghar to the franchise structure. The Sheldon–Primghar team was awarded a record of 14–11, when beginning play on June 25, 1903.

The newly named "Sheldon–Primghar Hyphens" finished 44–35 overall, placing second in the 1903 Iowa–South Dakota League standings, finishing 2.5 games behind the champion Le Mars Blackbirds. John McBurney and Bud Jones were the 1903 managers in Sheldon after Buck Keith managed the team in Council Bluffs. The team moniker was a reference to the combined names of the towns. Primghar, Iowa is 10 miles southeast of Sheldon, Iowa. The Iowa–South Dakota League permanently folded following the 1903 season.

After the folding of the Iowa–South Dakota League Sheldon and Primghar have not hosted another minor league franchise.

== The ballpark ==
The Sheldon and Sheldon–Primghar Hyphens teams played home games at Sheldon City Park. Today, the park still exists as a city park with softball fields. Sheldon City Park is located off Park Street (US 18) between 4th Avenue & 6th Avenue, Sheldon, Iowa.

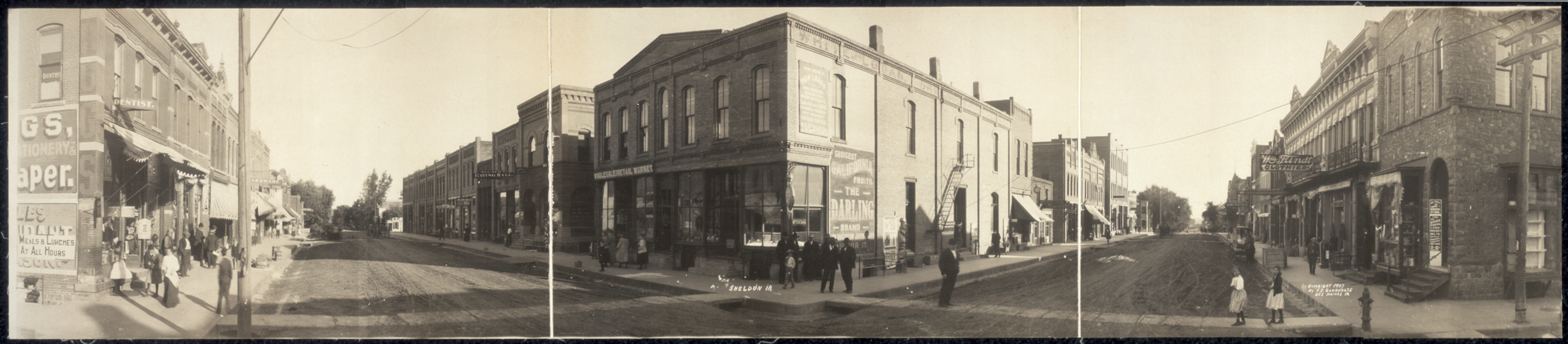
(1907) Sheldon, Iowa

== Timeline ==
Year(s)	# Yrs.	Team	Level	League	Ballpark
1902	1	Sheldon	Class D	Iowa-South Dakota League	Sheldon City Park
1903	1	Sheldon–Primghar Hyphens	Class D	Iowa-South Dakota League	Sheldon City Park

== Year–by–year records ==
Year	Record	Finish	Managers	Playoffs/Notes
1902	14–71	6th	H.M. Moser / Mickie Jamison; Frank Albertson / Artie Ward	No playoffs held
1903	44–35	2nd	Buck Keith; John McBurney / Bud Jones	Council Bluffs moved to Sheldon June 20; Team given 14–11 record to begin

== Notable alumni ==
- No Sheldon or Sheldon–Primghar Hyphens players advanced to play major league baseball.
