= Le Mars Blackbirds =

- 1902–1903; Le Mars, Iowa

Minor league affiliations
- Class: Class D (1902–1903)
- League: Iowa-South Dakota League (1902–1903)

Major league affiliations
- Team: None

Minor league titles
- League titles (1): 1903

Team data
- Name: Le Mars Blackbirds (1902–1903)
- Ballpark: Unknown (1902–1903)

The Le Mars Blackbirds were a minor league baseball team based in Le Mars, Iowa. In 1902 and 1903, the Blackbirds played as members of the Class D level Iowa-South Dakota League, capturing the 1903 league championship.

The Le Mars "Blackbirds" nickname was coined after manager Bob Black.

Baseball Hall of Fame member Branch Rickey played for the 1903 Le Mars Blackbirds in his first professional season.

== History ==
Minor league baseball began in Le Mars in 1902, when the Le Mars "Blackbirds" became charter members of the six–team Iowa-South Dakota League The Iowa-South Dakota League was formed as a Class D level League. The Le Mars "Blackbirds" nickname derived from manager Bob Black and his son Bob Black Jr, who played for the team.

The president of the new Iowa–South Dakota League was J.U. Sammis, a local attorney who practiced and resided in Le Mars. In their first season, the Blackbirds finished with a final record of 43–48. Le Mars placed fourth in the Iowa–South Dakota League standings, playing the season under managers Bobby Alberts and Bob Black. Black was a resident of Le Mars and owned a local bowling alley. A retired major league player, Black was recruited to become the manager after being spotted watching an early game from the stands. In 1902, Grandstand seats were .25 cents for Le Mars games.

The 1902 Iowa–South Dakota League standings featured the Flandreau Indians (51–19), Le Mars Blackbirds (43–48), Rock Rapids Browns 39–52, Sheldon (14–71), Sioux City Cornhuskers (56–40) and the champion Sioux Falls Canaries (65–24).

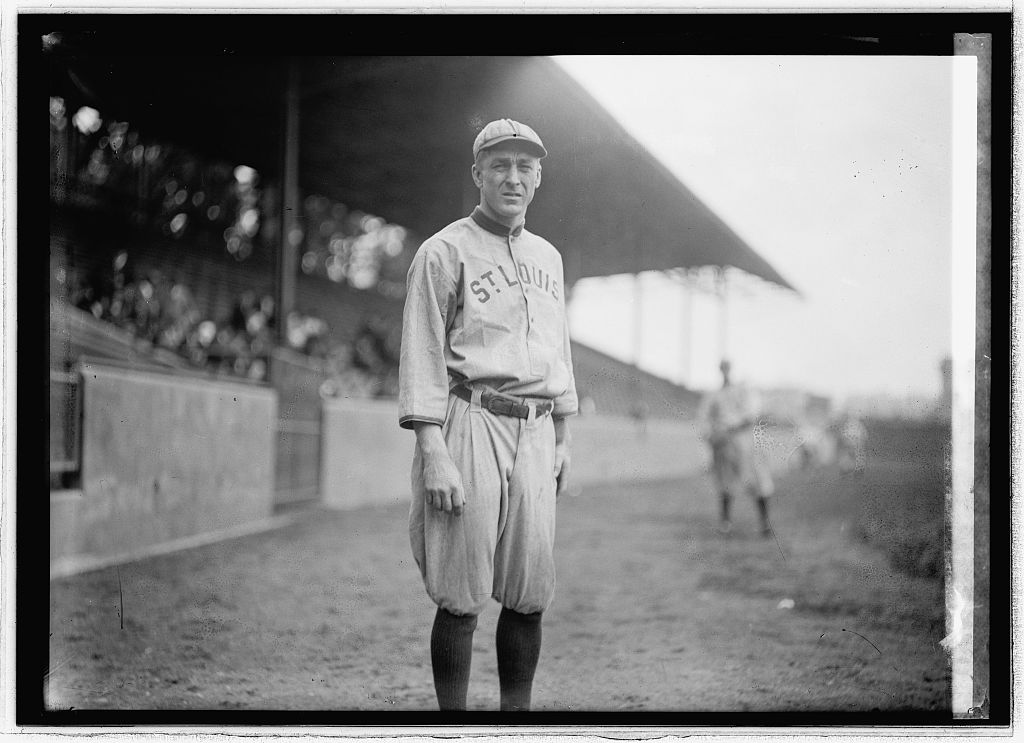
Branch Rickey, St. Louis Browns

In their second season, the Blackbirds continued Iowa–South Dakota League play in the final season of the league. The Blackbirds had success with future Baseball Hall of Fame member Branch Rickey on the roster for the Le Mars. In June 1903, Le Mars manager Bob Black signed Rickey, an Ohio native, to a contract with a salary of $150 per month. A noted manager and baseball executive after his playing career, Rickey was best known for famously signing Jackie Robinson to the Brooklyn Dodgers while serving as Brooklyn's General Manager. A Methodist, Rickey reportedly didn't play in baseball games held on Sunday. Rickey hit .265 in 41 games for Le Mars as a catcher.

In 1903, the president of the Iowa-South Dakota League was again J. U. Sammism, a Le Mars attorney.

In a July 1903 game, an umpire named "Lally" ejected Le Mars manager Bobby Black from a game and also fined him $5.00 for his actions.

With Branch Rickey on the team, the 1903 Le Mars Blackbirds won the Iowa–South Dakota League championship. In what proved to be the final season for the Iowa–South Dakota League, the Blackbirds finished the season with a 48–34 record. Their record was placed them first in the Iowa–South Dakota League under returning manager Bob Black, with Le Mars finishing 2.5 games ahead of the second place Council Bluffs Bluffers/Sheldon-Primghar Hyphens. No playoffs were held. The Iowa–South Dakota League permanently folded after the 1903 season.

After the 1903 season, each member of the 1903 Le Mars Championship team received a gold medal inscribed with "ISD Pennant Winners," the player's name and the date.

After the folding of the league, Le Mars has not hosted another minor league team.

== The ballpark ==
The name of the Le Mars Blackbirds' home minor league ballpark is not directly referenced. Le Mars' Riverview Park and West Floyd Park were both in use during the era. Both parks still host baseball today in Le Mars, Iowa.

== Timeline ==
Year(s)	# Yrs.	Team	Level	League
1902–1903	2	Le Mars Blackbirds	Class D	Iowa-South Dakota League

== Year–by–year records ==
Year	Record	Finish	Manager	Playoffs/Notes
1902	43–44	4th	Bobby Alberts / Bob Black	No playoffs held
1903	48–34	1st	Bob Black	League champions

== Notable alumni ==
- Branch Rickey (1903) Inducted Baseball Hall of Fame, 1967
- Bob Black (1902–1903, MGR)
- George Bristow (1902)
- Jim Buchanan (1902)
- Pete Lister (1902)
- Peaches O'Neill (1902)

== See also ==
- Le Mars Blackbirds players
