= Rock Rapids Browns =

- 1902; Rock Rapids, Iowa

Minor league affiliations
- Class: Class D (1902)
- League: Iowa-South Dakota League (1902)

Major league affiliations
- Team: None

Minor league titles
- League titles (0): None

Team data
- Name: Rock Rapids Browns (1902)
- Ballpark: Unknown (1902)

The Rock Rapids Browns were a minor league baseball team based in Rock Rapids, Iowa. The Rock Rapids Browns played the 1902 season as members of the Class D level Iowa-South Dakota League. The Rock Rapids Browns are the only minor league team hosted in Rock Rapids to date.

== History ==
Minor league baseball began in Rock Rapids, Iowa in 1902, when the Rock Rapids Browns became charter members of the six–team Iowa-South Dakota League. Rock Rapids joined the Flandreau Indians, Le Mars Blackbirds, Sheldon, Sioux City Cornhuskers and Sioux Falls Canaries teams as charter members in the newly formed Class D level league.

In their first season of play, the Rock Rapids Browns placed fifth in the 1902 Iowa–South Dakota League final standings. The Browns ended the season with a record of 32–59, finishing 34.0 games behind the first place Sioux Falls Canaries, as the Iowa–South Dakota League held no playoffs. The Browns, playing under manager "Grandpa" Greene, finished behind the Sioux City Cornhuskers, Flandreau Indians and Le Mars Blackbirds and ahead of sixth place Sheldon teams.

After a home game in Rock Rapids, it was reported that fans rushed the field, angry at an umpire. It was also reported that after the Browns started poorly, a meeting was held in Rock Rapids and fans were sent out to the Iowa cities of Des Moines, Algona, Sioux City and Flandreau to scout for better players.

Reports noted that by mid–August, Rock Rapids pitcher Ralph Thomas had been suspended from the team for "drunkenness." Rock Rapids teammate Joe Snooks was also suspended from the team for "drunkenness" and insulting a "respectable married lady of Rock Rapids."

Placing fifth in the 1902 league standings, Rock Rapids finished behind the champion Sioux Falls Canaries (65–24), Sioux City Cornhuskers (56–40) Flandreau Indians (51–19), Le Mars Blackbirds (43–48) and ahead of Sheldon (14–71).

The Rock Rapids Browns permanently folded after the 1902 season. A meeting was held to discuss the franchise returning to play in 1903, which did occur without a Rock Rapids team in the league. The Iowa–South Dakota League played its final season in 1903 as a four–team league before folding.

== The ballpark ==
The name of the minor league ballpark for the Rock Rapids Browns is not directly referenced. The site of today's Borman Forster Fields was in use during the era as a public park. Still in use as a public park today, the location of the 21-acre park is 1400 South 3rd Avenue in Rock Rapids, Iowa.

Lyon County Iowa Incorporated and Unincorporated areas Rock Rapids Highlighted

== Timeline ==
Year(s)	# Yrs.	Team	Level	League
1902	1	Rock Rapids Browns	Class D	Iowa-South Dakota League

== Year-by-year record ==
Year	Record	Finish	Manager	Playoffs/Notes
1902	32–59	5th	Grandpa Greene	No playoffs held

== Notable alumni ==
- Babe Towne (1902)
- Rock Rapids Browns players
