= Jim Powell (baseball) =

American baseball player (1859–1929)

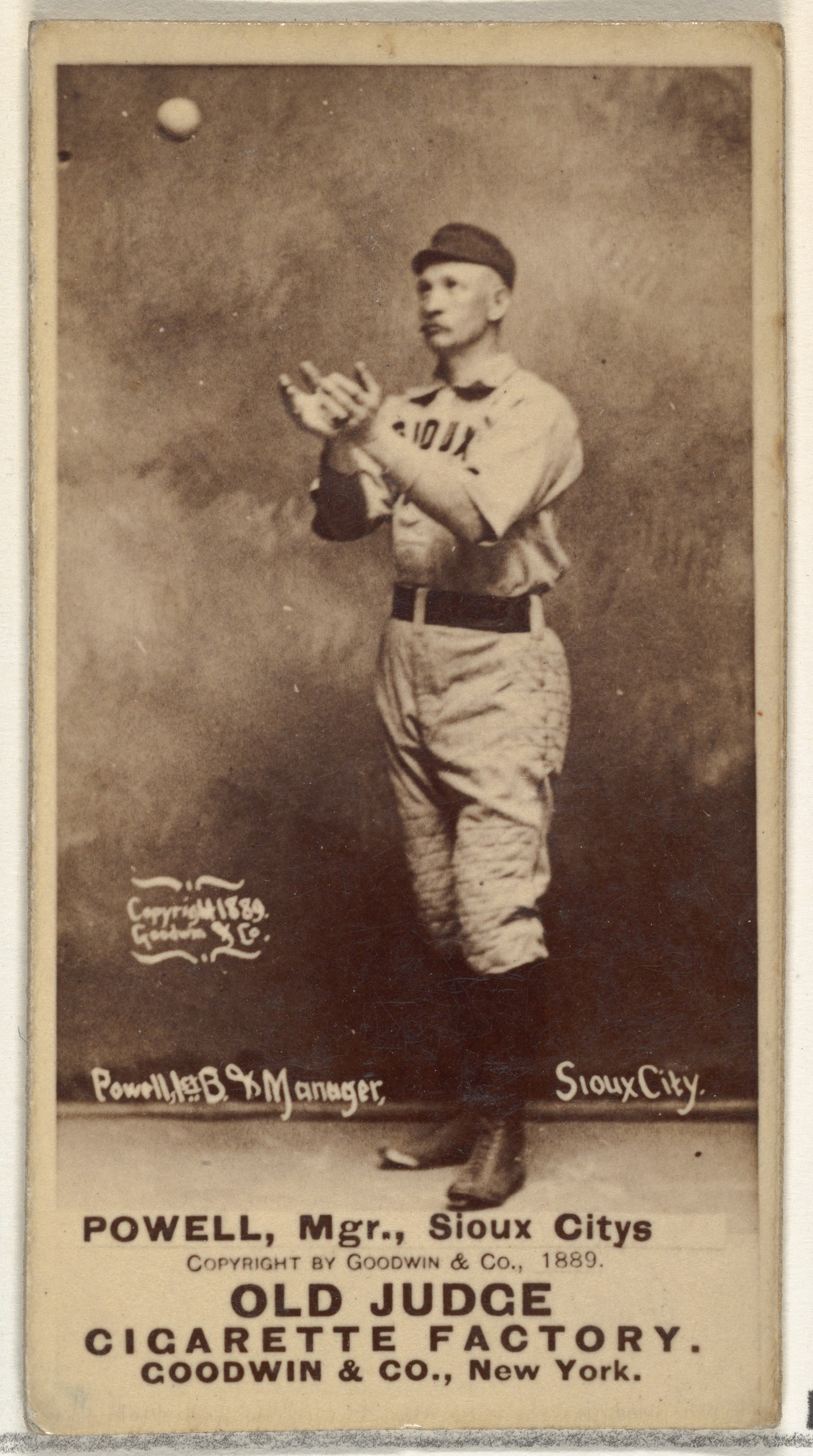
- First baseman
- Born: August 30, 1859; Richmond, Virginia, U.S.
- Died: November 20, 1929 (aged 70); Butte, Montana, U.S.
- Batted: Unknown Threw: Unknown

MLB debut
- August 5, 1884, for the Richmond Virginians

Last MLB appearance
- October 5, 1885, for the Philadelphia Athletics

MLB statistics
- Batting average: .217
- Home runs: 0
- Runs batted in: 5
- Stats at Baseball Reference

Teams
- Richmond Virginians (1884); Philadelphia Athletics (1885)

James Edwin Powell (August 30, 1859 – November 20, 1929) was an American professional baseball first baseman in 1884 and 1885. He was born in Richmond, Virginia, and died in Butte, Montana.
