= Ernie Beam =

American baseball player (1867–1918)

- Pitcher
- Born: March 17, 1867; Mansfield, Ohio, U.S.
- Died: September 12, 1918 (aged 51); Mansfield, Ohio, U.S.
- Batted: Unknown Threw: Right

MLB debut
- May 2, 1895, for the Philadelphia Phillies

Last MLB appearance
- August 3, 1895, for the Philadelphia Phillies

MLB statistics
- Win–loss record: 0-2
- Earned run average: 11.31
- Strikeouts: 3
- Stats at Baseball Reference

Teams
- Philadelphia Phillies (1895)

Ernest Joseph Beam (March 17, 1867 – September 12, 1918) was an American professional baseball player. He was a right-handed pitcher for one season (1895) with the Philadelphia Phillies. For his career, he compiled an 0–2 record in 9 appearances, with an 11.31 earned run average and 3 strikeouts.

== See also ==
- List of Major League Baseball annual saves leaders
