= Omaha Packers =

- 1879–1936; (1879, 1885, 1887-1892, 1894–1895, 1898, 1900–1936); Omaha, Nebraska

Minor league affiliations
- Class: Class A (1888, 1892, 1894); Class B (1900); Class A (1901–1936)
- League: Northwestern League (1879); Western League (1885, 1887); Western Association (1888–1891); Western League (1892); Western Association (1894–1895); Western League (1898, 1900–1936)

Major league affiliations
- Team: None

Minor league titles
- League titles (5): 1889; 1904; 1907; 1917; 1924

Team data
- Name: Omaha Green Stockings (1879); Omaha Omahogs (1885, 1887–1890); Omaha Lambs (1891); Omaha Omahogs (1892, 1894–1895, 1898, 1900–1901); Omaha Indians (1902–1903); Omaha Rangers (1904); Omaha Rourkes (1905–1920); Omaha Buffaloes (1921–1927); Omaha Crickets (1928–1929); Omaha Packers (1930–1935); Omaha Robin Hoods (1936)
- Ballpark: Omaha Baseball Grounds(1885–1898); Omaha Baseball Park (1900–1911) aka Rourke Park(1911–1934) aka Vinton Street Park (1935–1936)

The Omaha Packers were a minor league baseball team based in Omaha, Nebraska. Between 1879 and 1935, Omaha minor league teams had a long tenure as members of the Western League and Western Association, winning five league championships. Omaha teams played under numerous other nicknames prior to the becoming the "Packers" in 1930.

Baseball Hall of Fame members Mordecai Brown (1902), Joe Kelley (1892), Heinie Manush (1922), Kid Nichols (1889) and Frank Selee (1888-1889, MGR) were all members of Omaha teams.

After a partial season in 1936, the Omaha Packers were succeeded in the Western League by the Omaha Cardinals in 1947.

== History ==
Minor league baseball first came to Omaha, Nebraska, in 1879, as the Omaha Green Stockings, played as members of the Northwestern League, where all the other members had "stockings" monikers. The 1879 Mashers/Green Stockings finished with a 5–13 record playing alongside the Davenport Brown Stockings, Dubuque Red Stockings and Rockford White Stockings in the four–team league.

In 1885, the Omaha Omahogs became founding members of the early Western League. The Omaha Omahogs played as members of the Western League in 1887, 1892, 1898 and 1900–1901. The 1885 inaugural Western League season featured the Omahogs and the Cleveland Forest Citys, Indianapolis Hoosiers, Kansas City Blues, Milwaukee Milwaukees and Toledo Avengers. Omaha gained a franchise in the new league after St. Paul, Minnesota, withdrew their proposed team due to financial difficulties. Omaha folded after starting the season with a record of 4–24. Omaha was replaced by the Keokuk Hawkeyes on June 6, 1885. The league itself folded on June 15, 1885.

The Omaha Omahogs were members of the Western Association in 1888–1890 and 1894–1895, before rejoining the reformed Western League both times. The 1888 Omahogs were a charter member of the Western Association, along with the Chicago Maroons, Davenport Onion Weeders, Des Moines Prohibitionists, Kansas City Blues, Milwaukee Brewers, Minneapolis Millers, St. Louis Whites, St. Paul Apostles and Sioux City Cornhuskers in the ten–team league. The 1889 Omaha Omahogs finished with a record of 83–38 to capture the Western Association Championship behind Baseball Hall of Fame pitcher Kid Nichols and with Baseball Hall of Fame manager Frank Selee. The 1891 Western Association team was named the Omaha Lambs for just one season, finishing 51–39 to place 3rd in 1891. Baseball Hall of Fame inductee Joe Kelley hit .316 for the Omaha Omahogs in 1892, at age 20.

The 1895 Omaha Omahogs moved to Denver, Colorado, during the Western Association season on July 22, 1895, before the team folded on August 22, 1895.

In 1898, the Omaha Omahogs rejoined the Western League under Hall of Fame league President Ban Johnson and were 22–39 when the franchise relocated to become the St. Joseph Saints on July 6, 1898.

In 1900, now owned by Manager Pa Rourke, the Omaha Omahogs rejoined the Western League. Omaha remained as members for the next 35 seasons of the Western League. The Omahogs finished 4th in 1900 and 5th in 1901.

The Omaha Indians (1902–1903) finished 84–56 (.600) in 1902, just percentage points behind the Kansas City Blue Stockings (82–54 .603) for the Western League Championship. Baseball Hall of Fame inductee Mordecai Brown pitched for the Omaha Indians in 1902, winning 27 games. The Indians finished last with a 49–79 record in 1903.

The 1904 Omaha Rangers finished with a record of 90–60 to capture the 1904 Western League Championship under Manager Pa Rourke. The team was led by Jack Pfiester and Del Howard.

After the success of 1904 under owner/manager Billy "Pa" Rourke, the renamed Omaha Rourkes played in the Western League from 1905 to 1920. Rourke managed the Omaha in 1898, 1900–1910, 1912–1915 and 1917. The 1907 Omaha Rourkes finished 84–63 to win the 1907 Western League Championship. In Pa Rourke's last season as Manager, Omaha finished 92–57 to capture the 1917 Western League Championship.

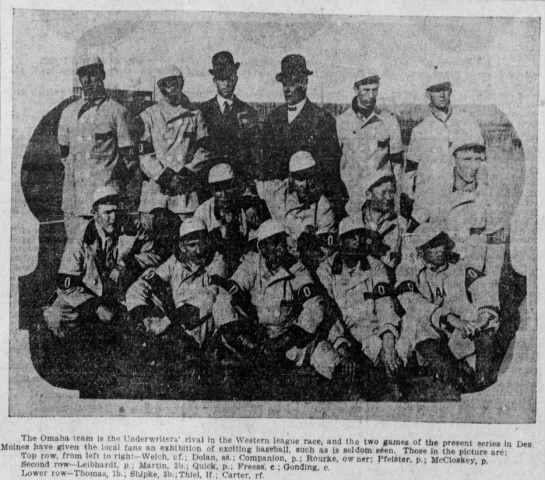
1905 Omaha Rourkes

The franchise became the Omaha Buffaloes (1921–1927), after owner Pa Rourke sold the team to new owner/manager Barney Burch. In 1921, Jack Lelivelt hit. 416 for the Buffaloes to lead the Western League. Baseball Hall of Fame player Heinie Manush hit .376 with 20 home runs for the Omaha Buffaloes in 1922. Omaha finished 1921 95–73 (2nd), 1922 91–77 (4th) and 1923 92–74 (4th) before the 1924 Omaha Buffaloes finished 103–61 and captured the 1924 Western League Championship under Manager Art Griggs.

Remaining in the Western League, the franchise played as the Omaha Crickets in 1928–1929. The Crickets finished 71–86 (6th) in 1928 and 81–75 (3rd) in 1929.

As the Omaha "Packers" (1930–1935), Omaha continued play in the Western League. The Omaha Packers finished 2nd in 1930, with a 76–66 record. Omaha then finished last in the eight–team league in 1931 (49–97) and 1932 (48–88). The Packers finished 63–61 (5th) in 1933 and 49–79 (7th) in 1934. The 1935 Omaha Packers were 22–15, when Omaha moved to Council Bluffs, Iowa, on June 25, 1935, to become the Council Bluffs Rails. The team disbanded on July 27, 1935, with a 33–31 overall record.

Omaha regained a franchise, when the Omaha Robin Hoods rejoined the Western League in 1936. The new owners were the Fontenelle Brewery, makers of a beer labeled "Robin Hood". The Omaha Robin Hoods were forced to play some early games in Lincoln, Nebraska, due to weather. Then a fire destroyed the Omaha ballpark in the early morning hours of August 14, 1936. Omaha, at 56–44, was forced to move to Rock Island, Illinois, where the team finished the 1936 season as the Rock Island Islanders.

After the 1936 season, Omaha remained without a minor league team until the Omaha Cardinals rejoined the Western League in 1947.

== The ballparks ==
From 1885 through 1898, the various short-lived Omaha teams played their home games at several locations on the north side of Omaha. According to newspaper writeups in the Omaha Bee and other local sources, supplemented by Sanborn maps in some years, the early ballparks of the various clubs were:

- 1879: Omaha "ball grounds" – located "in Lake's addition, at the northern terminus of the street railway". This would be around North 18th Street and Ohio Street. The Northwestern League collapsed during the season. The general area is now residential.
- 1885–1892: Omaha Baseball Grounds – bounded by North 20th Street (east, first base); buildings and Locust Street (north, right field); buildings and North 22nd Street (west, left field); and Miami Street (south, third base); Maple Street teed into the property on the left field side. It was later converted to a Y.M.C.A. Park, and still later became University Park, home of the University Athletic Club. The site is now a residential area.
- 1894–mid-1895: Charles Street Park – bounded by Charles Street; 17th Street (east); and 18th Street (west). In mid-summer 1895, the club moved to the Fair Grounds, after which this venue was converted to the Charles Street Bicycle Park, a bike racing track which operated for a few years. The site is now a combination of residential and commercial.
- mid-1895: Fair Grounds – bounded by Ames Avenue, 16th Street and 20th Street. The club tried a fresh start here, but it did not work, and the club moved to Denver before the season ended. The site is now a residential area.
- 1898: Omaha Base Ball Park or Ames Avenue Park – bounded by Ames Avenue (south, home plate); 24th Street (east); and 25th Street (west). Near the Fair Grounds. The club again failed by mid-season, and moved to St. Joseph. Later it became another Y.M.C.A. Park for a while. The site is now occupied by commercial businesses.

After those various false starts in the 19th century, Omaha professional baseball moved to the south side and finally found some success. From 1900 to 1936, Omaha played home games at the Omaha Baseball Park. The ballpark was also known as Rourke's Park from 1911 to 1934 and Vinton Street Park from 1935 to 1936. The park was sometimes called Western League Park as well, or just League Park. The ballpark had a capacity of 10,000 (1920), 8,500 (1931) and 6,000 (1936), with dimensions (Left, Center, Right) of 320-368-298 (1936). Fans entered at entry gates on 15th Street and Vinton Street. In 1927, Babe Ruth and Lou Gehrig played in an exhibition game at Rourke Park that drew thousands. The ballpark was bounded by South 15th Street (west, third base); Vinton Street (south, first base); buildings and Castelar Street (north, left field); and buildings and South 13th Street (east, right field). City directories give the address as 2519 South 15th Street. The Vinton Street Park was destroyed by fire in August 1936, forcing Omaha to move to Rock Island, Illinois, and finish the season as the Rock Island Rocks. The site is now a residential area.

== Timeline ==
Year(s)	# Yrs.	Team	Level	League
1879	1	Omaha Green Stockings	Independent	Northwestern League
1885, 1887	2	Omaha Omahogs	Independent	Western League
1888	1	Omaha Omahogs	Class A	Western Association
1889–1890	2	Omaha Omahogs	Independent	Western Association
1891	1	Omaha Lambs	Independent	Western Association
1892	1	Omaha Omahogs	Class A	Western League
1894–1895	2	Omaha Omahogs	Class A	Western Association
1898	1	Omaha Omahogs	Class A	Western League
1900	1	Omaha Omahogs	Class B	Western League
1901	1	Omaha Omahogs	Class A	Western League
1902–1903	2	Omaha Indians	Class A	Western League
1904	1	Omaha Rangers	Class A	Western League
1905–1920	16	Omaha Rourkes	Class A	Western League
1921–1927	7	Omaha Buffaloes	Class A	Western League
1928–1929	2	Omaha Crickets	Class A	Western League
1930–1935	6	Omaha Packers	Class A	Western League
1936	1	Omaha Robin Hoods	Class A	Western League

== Notable alumni ==
- Mordecai Brown (1902) Inducted Baseball Hall of Fame, 1949
- Joe Kelley (1892) Inducted Baseball Hall of Fame, 1971
- Heinie Manush (1922) Inducted Baseball Hall of Fame, 1964
- Kid Nichols (1889) Inducted Baseball Hall of Fame, 1949
- Frank Selee (1888-1889, MGR) Inducted Baseball Hall of Fame, 1999
- Jimmy Austin (1907-1908)
- Bill Bailey (1925)
- Joe Bowman (1930)
- Buster Brown (1904)
- Eddie Brown (1932, MGR)
- Jumbo Brown (1929)
- Dad Clarke (1888–1891)
- Jack Crooks (1889)
- Jim Donnelly (1891)
- Sam Dungan (1891)
- Jocko Fields (1891)
- Jocko Flynn (1888)
- Frank Foreman (1902)
- Herman Franks (1934)
- George Grantham (1922)
- Art Griggs (1924–1925, MGR)
- Fred Haney (1920–1921)
- Mel Harder (1927) 4x MLB All-Star; Cleveland Indians No. 18 retired; Cleveland Indians Hall of Fame
- Babe Herman (1922)
- Del Howard (1904)
- Tom Hughes (1900)
- Eddie Joost (1934) 2x MLB All-Star; Philadelphia Phillies Hall of Fame
- Ed Konetchy (1923)
- Phil Knell (1889)
- Harry Krause (1916) 1909 AL ERA Title
- Jack Lelivelt (1920–1921)
- Herman Long (1906) Braves Hall of Fame
- Tom Lovett (1888)
- Fred Luderus (1928)
- Bill McClellan (1891)
- Chippy McGarr (1888)
- Irish Meusel (1931)
- Clarence Mitchell (1936, MGR)
- Bert Niehoff (1911)
- Ernie Orsatti (1926)
- Frank Owen (1902)
- Emilio Palmero (1920)
- Frank Papish (1936)
- George Perring (1906)
- Ollie Pickering (1911)
- Jack Pfiester (1904–1905) 1907 NL ERA Leader
- Pat Ragan (1907)
- Frank Scheibeck (1892)
- Emmett Seery (1894)
- Jimmy Slagle (1895)
- Pop Smith (1891) Canadian Baseball Hall of Fame
- Roy Spencer (1922)
- Jake Stenzel (1890)
- Monty Stratton (1934) MLB All-Star; The Stratton Story
- Lee Tannehill (1915)
- Fresco Thompson (1924)
- Elam Vangilder (1918)
- Jim Whitney (1879)
