= Vinton Street Park =

Former baseball park in Omaha, Nebraska

Coordinates: 41°14′08″N 95°56′07″W

Vinton Street Park was one of the most common names for the professional baseball park in Omaha, Nebraska from 1900 through 1936. It was destroyed by fire, and eleven years passed before Omaha acquired a professional ball club again.

== History ==
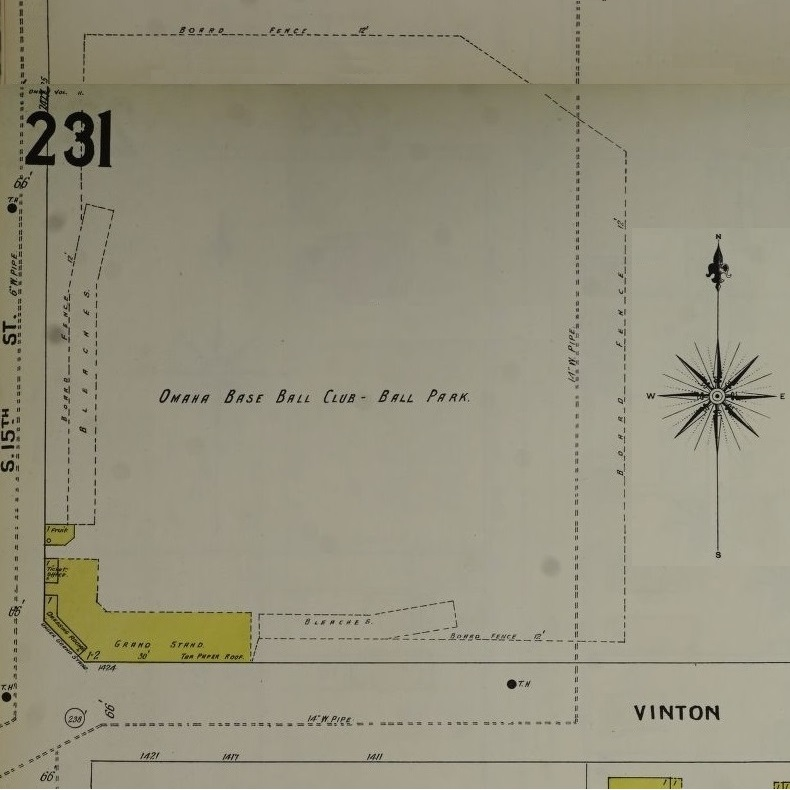
Vinton Street Park in 1901

After several false starts in the 19th Century, a new Omaha club was established in the newly revived Western League in 1900, with a new ballpark on the northeast corner of Vinton Street and 15th Street.

City directories gave its address as 2519 South 15th Street (west, third base); the other boundaries were Vinton Street (south, first base); buildings and Castelar Street (north, left field); and buildings and South 13th Street (east, right field).

It was the first professional Omaha ballpark built in the general area of South Omaha. Its predecessors had all been built in the general area of North Omaha.

The Omaha club was owned and managed by Billy "Pa" Rourke (1864–1932), whose leadership led to relative prosperity and allowed Omaha to keep its team for most of the next 37 seasons.

Both the team and the ballpark underwent various name changes during their existence. The team began as the Omahogs, a traditional 19th Century name. Over time they were redubbed the Indians, the Rangers, the Rourkes, the Buffaloes, the Crickets and finally the Packers.

The ballpark, ostensibly Omaha Baseball Park, was often called Vinton Street Park, and during Rourke's ownership it was often called Rourke's Park. It was also called Western League Park or just League Park.

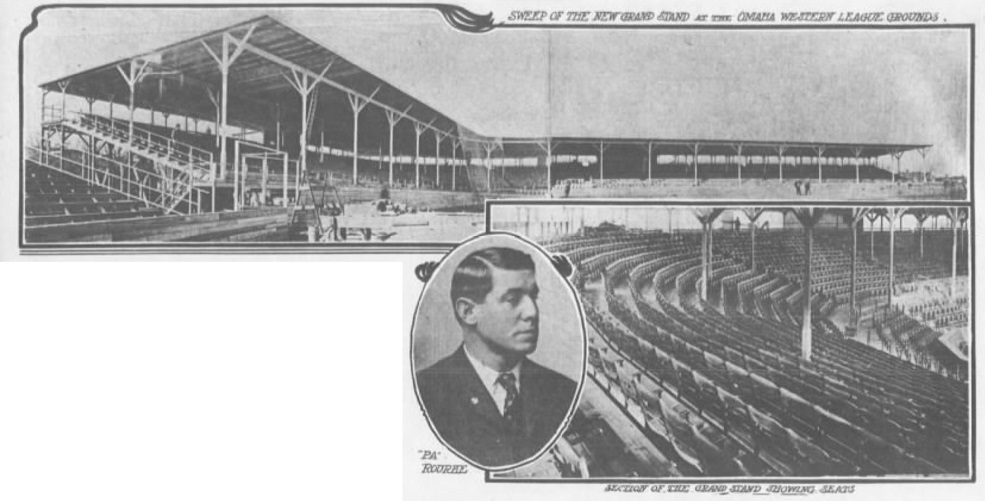
Vinton Street Park in 1911

In its early years, the club was generally strong and drew well at the box office. Under Rourke they won Western League championships in 1904, 1907 and 1917. Finally achieving some prosperity, they were able to rebuild and expand the ballpark in time for the 1911 season. Rourke sold the club after 1917, which went on to win another WL pennant in 1924 under new ownership.

The Great Depression set in during the 1930s, and the Omaha club struggled to stay solvent. A move to night baseball in 1930 helped for a while. But as early as the next season, there was talk of playing some games in nearby Council Bluffs, Iowa. During the 1935 season, the club abandoned Omaha and moved to Council Bluffs, but disbanded not long after.

A new WL club, called the Omaha Robin Hoods (named for a sponsor's beer brand), began the next season. The club played well, but disaster struck in the early morning hours of August 14, when the ballpark was destroyed by fire. There were immediate calls for building a new, modern facility, but that would take a dozen years to come to fruition. In the meantime, the club moved to Rock Island, Illinois, and that was the end of professional ball in Omaha until a new team called the Omaha Cardinals joined the Western League in 1947.

The ballpark site is now a residential area. As it happens, Rosenblatt Stadium was built about a half mile south of the Vinton Street ballpark.
