= Frank Scheibeck =

American baseball player (1865–1956)

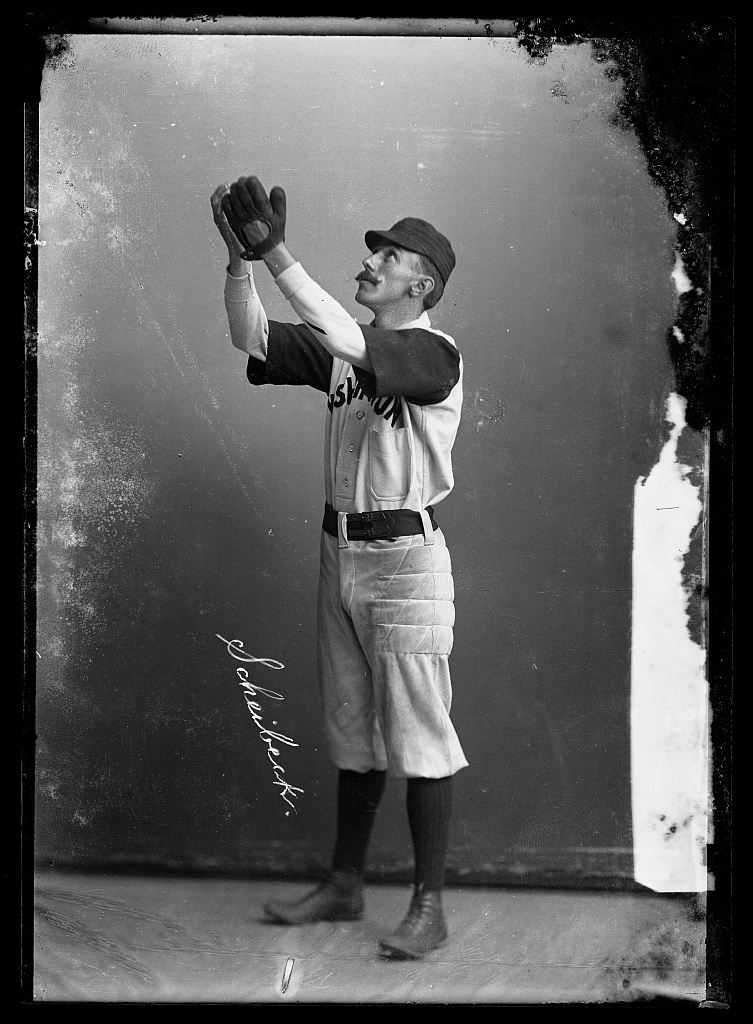
- Shortstop
- Born: June 28, 1865; Detroit, Michigan, U.S.
- Died: October 22, 1956 (aged 91); Detroit, Michigan, U.S.
- Batted: Right Threw: Right

MLB debut
- May 9, 1887, for the Cleveland Blues

Last MLB appearance
- September 13, 1906, for the Detroit Tigers

MLB statistics
- Batting average: .235
- Runs: 214
- Runs batted in: 148
- Stats at Baseball Reference

Teams
- Cleveland Blues (1887); Detroit Wolverines (1888); Toledo Maumees (1890); Pittsburgh Pirates (1894); Washington Senators (1894–1895, 1899); Cleveland Blues (1901); Detroit Tigers (1906)

Frank S. Scheibeck (June 28, 1865 – October 22, 1956) was an American shortstop in professional baseball from 1887 to 1906. He played eight seasons of Major League Baseball for the Cleveland Blues (1887, 1901), Detroit Wolverines (1888), Toledo Maumees (1890), Pittsburgh Pirates (1894), Washington Senators (1894–95, 1899), and Detroit Tigers (1906).

== Baseball player ==
Scheibeck was born in Detroit in 1865. He played professional baseball in Detroit in three decades and three leagues, for the Detroit Wolverines of the National League in 1888, for the Detroit Tigers of the Western League from 1895 to 1896, and for the Detroit Tigers of the American League in 1906. When he signed with the Tigers in April 1895, the Detroit Free Press wrote: "Scheibeck is not only a daring and good fielder, but he is fast on the lines and can do his share of hitting."

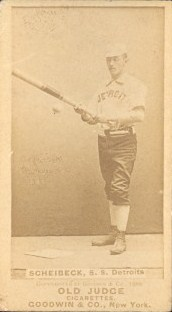
A baseball card of Scheibeck

Scheibeck began his professional baseball career in 1887 playing shortstop for the Duluth Freezers in the Northwestern League. He compiled a .335 batting average and stole 47 bases in 94 games at Duluth. He played the next two seasons for the London Tecumsehs in the International League. In 1888, he had a .305 batting average and 81 stolen bases in 92 games for London.

While Scheibeck appeared in three games for the Cleveland Blues in 1887 and one game for the Detroit Wolverines in 1888, his first extended playing time in Major League Baseball was in 1890 with the Toledo Maumees of the American Association. That year, he led the league with 134 games played at shortstop, 282 putouts at shortstop, and 412 assists at shortstop, but also led the league with 92 errors. He also compiled a .350 on-base percentage, drew 76 bases on balls, and stole 57 bases for Toledo in 1890.

After a full season in a major league in 1890, Schebeck spent the next three seasons in the minor leagues, playing for the Sioux City Corn Huskers (1891), Atlanta Firecrackers (1892), Omaha Omahogs (1892), Erie Blackbirds (1893), and Los Angeles Angels (1893).

Scheibeck returned to the major leagues in 1894 with the Pittsburgh Pirates. He compiled a .353 batting average and .421 on-base percentage in 116 plate appearances for the Pirates. In 1895, his batting average plummeted to .180 while playing for the Washington Senators.

Between 1897 and 1900, Schebeck played in the Eastern League for the Syracuse Stars (1897) and Montreal Royals (1898–1900).

In 1901, Sheibeck again returned to the major leagues as the starting shortstop for the Cleveland Blues. He appeared in 93 games for the Blues as the seventh oldest player in the American League.

Scheibeck began the 1903 season playing for the Rochester Bronchos in the Eastern League. In June 1903, Scheibeck quit the Rochester club and signed with the Denver Grizzlies in the Western League.

== Later years ==
At the time of the 1920 U.S. Census, Scheibeck was living in Detroit with his wife, Josephine, and their daughter, Josephine. Scheibeck was employed at the time as a real estate salesman.

At the time of the 1930 and 1940 U.S. Censuses, he was living in Detroit with his second wife Theodoshia (Phillips) Scheibeck. He was employed as a real estate salesman in 1930 and as a busher in an auto buckling department in 1940.

In October 1956, Scheibeck died at St. Joseph's Hospital in Detroit at age 91.

== See also ==
- List of Major League Baseball single-game hits leaders
