= Bill Carney =

American baseball player (1874–1938)

- Right fielder
- Born: March 25, 1874; St. Paul, Minnesota, U.S.
- Died: July 31, 1938 (aged 64); Hopkins, Minnesota, U.S.
- Batted: Both Threw: Right

MLB debut
- August 22, 1904, for the Chicago Cubs

Last MLB appearance
- August 22, 1904, for the Chicago Cubs

Teams
- Chicago Cubs (1904)

William John Carney (March 25, 1874 – July 31, 1938) was an American Major League Baseball outfielder. Bill played two games in his career in 1904, with the Chicago Cubs. He went 0 for 7 in a doubleheader.
