= Moose Baxter =

American baseball player (1876–1926)

- First baseman
- Born: July 27, 1876; Chippewa Falls, Wisconsin, U.S.
- Died: August 7, 1926 (aged 50); Portland, Oregon, U.S.
- Batted: Left Threw: Right

MLB debut
- April 19, 1907, for the St. Louis Cardinals

Last MLB appearance
- April 24, 1907, for the St. Louis Cardinals

MLB statistics
- Games played: 6
- At bats: 21
- Hit: 4
- Stats at Baseball Reference

Teams
- St. Louis Cardinals (1907)

John Morris "Moose" Baxter (July 27, 1876 – August 7, 1926) was an American Major League Baseball player. Baxter played for the St. Louis Cardinals in the 1907 season. He played in only six games during his single-season career, with four hits in 21 at-bats.

Baxter was born in Chippewa Falls, Wisconsin, and died in Portland, Oregon.
