= Homer Hillebrand =

American baseball player (1879–1974)

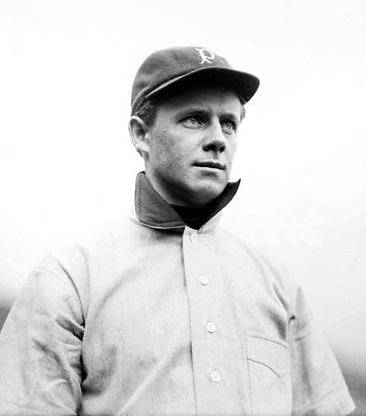
- Pitcher / First baseman
- Born: October 10, 1879; Freeport, Illinois, U.S.
- Died: January 20, 1974 (aged 94); Elsinore, California, U.S.
- Batted: Right Threw: Left

MLB debut
- April 24, 1905, for the Pittsburgh Pirates

Last MLB appearance
- April 24, 1908, for the Pittsburgh Pirates

MLB statistics (through Career)
- Win–loss record: 8–4
- Batting average: .237
- Earned run average: 2.51
- Stats at Baseball Reference

Teams
- Pittsburgh Pirates (1905–1908)

Homer Hiller Henry Hillebrand (October 10, 1879 – January 20, 1974) was an American professional baseball player who played three seasons for the Pittsburgh Pirates of Major League Baseball.

Hillebrand played college baseball at Princeton University.
