= Bob Black (baseball) =

American baseball player (1862–1933)

- Outfielder/Pitcher
- Born: December 10, 1862; Cincinnati, Ohio, U.S.
- Died: March 21, 1933 (aged 70); Sioux City, Iowa, U.S.
- Batted: Unknown Threw: Right

MLB debut
- August 19, 1884, for the Kansas City Cowboys

Last MLB appearance
- October 19, 1884, for the Kansas City Cowboys

MLB statistics
- Win–loss record: 4–9
- Earned run average: 3.22
- Strikeouts: 93
- Stats at Baseball Reference

Teams
- Kansas City Cowboys (1884)

Robert Benjamin Black (December 10, 1862 – March 21, 1933) was a 19th-century American professional baseball player. He played for the Kansas City Cowboys of the Union Association in 1884.

In 1902, Black became manager of the Le Mars Blackbirds, who were charter members of the six–team Iowa-South Dakota League The Iowa-South Dakota League was formed as a Class D level League. The Blackbirds finished with a final record of 43–48 and placed fourth in the Iowa–South Dakota League standings, playing the season under managers Bobby Alberts and his replacement, Bob Black. Black was a resident of Le Mars and owned a local bowling alley. As a retired major league player, Black was recruited to become the manager after being spotted watching a game from the stands early in the season.

In June 1903, Le Mars manager Bob Black signed Baseball Hall of Fame member Branch Rickey, to a contract with a salary of $150 per month. In his career, Rickey became best known for signing Jackie Robinson to the Brooklyn Dodgers while serving as Brooklyn's General Manager. In 1903, Rickey hit .265 in 41 games for Le Mars as the team's catcher and the Blackbirds won the league championship under Black.
