= Bismarck–Mandan Pards =

- 1922–1966; (1922–1923, 1955–1957, 1962–1964, 1966); Bismarck, North Dakota

Minor league affiliations
- Class: Class A (1963–1964, 1966); Class C (1962); Independent (1955–1957); Class D (1922–1923)
- League: Dakota League (1922); North Dakota League (1923); Manitoba-Dakota League (1955–1957); Northern League (1962–1964, 1966)

Major league affiliations
- Team: Minnesota Twins (1962–1964); Houston Astros (1966)

Minor league titles
- League titles (1): 1957
- Division titles (1): 1955

Team data
- Name: Bismarck Capitals (1922–1923); Bismarck Barons (1955–1957); Bismarck–Mandan Pards (1962–1964, 1966)
- Ballpark: Bismarck Municipal Ballpark (1922–1923, 1955–1957, 1962–1964, 1966)

The Bismarck–Mandan Pards were a minor league baseball team based in Bismarck, North Dakota in partnership with neighboring Mandan, North Dakota. The Bismarck–Mandan Pards played as members of the Northern League from 1962 to 1964 and in 1966. Previous Bismarck minor league teams played as members of the 1922 Dakota League, 1923 North Dakota League and the Manitoba-Dakota League from 1955 to 1957. The Bismarck–Mandan Pards were a minor league affiliate of the Minnesota Twins from 1962 to 1964 and Houston Astros in 1966. Bismarck hosted home minor league games at the Bismarck Municipal Ballpark

Baseball Hall of Fame member Ray Dandridge played for the 1955 Bismarck Barons and led the league in hits at age 41.

== History ==
Bismarck hosted numerous semi-pro and local teams, beginning in the late 1800's and continuing through the 1930's. The Bismarck teams had much success and integrated rosters that included Baseball Hall of Fame member, Satchel Paige.

=== Dakota League (1922) ===
Minor league baseball began in Bismarck, North Dakota in 1922. The Valley City Hi–Liners of the Class D level Dakota League moved to Bismarck on August 3, 1922 with a 25–46 record. Playing the remainder of the season as the Bismarck Capitals at Bismarck Municipal Ballpark, the Valley City/Bismarck team ended the Dakota League season with an overall record of 30–64, placing eighth in the Dakota League. Charlie Boardman, Ernie Menne, J. H. Sampson and Lou Bachant were the managers of the team. J.H. Sampson was the team president. Sampson first hired Charlie Boardman as player/manager of the team. But, shortly after the 1922 season began, Boardman was picked up by the Kansas City Blues, and first–baseman Ernie Menne briefly became manager. Sampson himself was serving as the manager at the time of the move from Valley City, with Bachant, the team's catcher becoming the manager after the franchise moved to Bismarck.

=== North Dakota League (1923) ===
The 1923 Bismarck Capitals continued play as members of the Class D level North Dakota League. The Bismarck Capitals resigned Charlie Boardman early in the 1923 season. Boardman was ejected from the game in the seventh inning of his first start for Bismarck, the first game of a doubleheader. Ejected in the seventh inning for talking back to the umpire, Boardman was also fined $10.00. Bismarck officials immediately paid the fine. Boardman then started the second game of the doubleheader and pitched a shut out of the Jamestown Jimkotans. Later in the 1923 season, Boardman had a 9–4 pitching record and league-leading .364 batting average when Bismarck suspended him without pay for “indifferent playing in the field.” Bismarck then traded Boardman to the new Valley City franchise. The Bismarck Capitals completed the 1923 season with a record of 26–42, placing fourth in the North Dakota League, playing the season under managers Tom Shanley and Maurice McKnight. The four–team North Dakota League permanently folded after the 1923 season.

After semi–professional baseball was first played in Bismarck in 1889, various teams of semi–pro and amateur status continued play in the city. In the 1930's, Baseball Hall of Fame members Satchel Paige and Hilton Smith played for the Bismarck Churchills semi-pro team. Satchel Paige was a pitcher for Bismarck in both 1933 and 1935. Smith played for the 1935 team. The 1935 Bismarck won the National Semi-Professional Baseball Championship Tournament. Other players included Ted "Double Duty" Radcliffe, Quincy Trouppe, Barney Morris, and Chet Brewer. In 1936, without Paige, Radcliffe, and Brewer, Bismarck returned to the national championships. Smith won four games, but Bismarck failed to repeat as champions.

=== Manitoba–Dakota League (1955 to 1957) ===
In 1955, the Bismarck Barons began play as members of the Independent Manitoba-Dakota League. In their three seasons, the Barons won both a pennant and a league championship. The 1955 Barons finished 47–41, to win the Manitoba–Dakota League regular season pennant, 3.0 games ahead of the second place Williston Oilers. In the Playoffs, the Dickinson Packers defeated Bismarck 4 games to 1. The team was Managed by Al Cihocki. Baseball Hall of Fame member Ray Dandridge played for the Bismarck Barons in 1955, hitting .360 in 328 at–bats and leading the league with 118 hits at age 41.

The Bismarck Barons finished in second place in 1956, with a 47–41 record, playing again under Manager Al Cihocki. Bismarck finished 1.0 games behind the Williston Oilers in the regular season standings and were defeated in the Manitoba–Dakota League playoffs by the Minot Mallards 4 games to 2.

In 1957, the Bismarck Barons finished first in the regular season with a 38–33 record to win a second Manitoba–Dakota League pennant. The 1957 Manager was Bill Hockenbury. Bismarck finished 1.0 games ahead of the second place Minot Minors in the regular season. Bismarck then defeated Minot in a weather affected playoffs to claim the championship. In the 1957 playoff Finals, the Bismarck Barons led the Minot Mallards 2 games to 1, when Minot forfeited after rain cancelled two games. The Manitoba-Dakota League permanently folded after the 1957 season.

Bismarck attempted to join the Northern League in 1958, along with the Minot Mallards. The league was considering expanding to ten teams. But the eight–team league wasn't able to successfully create a nine–team schedule when the Wausau franchise folded, so Bismarck did not gain the franchise.

=== Northern League (1962 to 1964, 1966) ===
Minor league baseball returned to Bismarck, when the 1962 Bismarck–Mandan Pards franchise, in partnership with neighboring Mandan, North Dakota, finally became members of the Class C level Northern League as an affiliate of the Minnesota Twins and playing at Bismarck Municipal Ballpark in Bismarck. Jack Hoeven, the father of the current North Dakota governor, was named team president. The Pards ended the 1962 season with a record of 60–62, placing sixth in the six–team Northern League, playing the season under Manager Vern Morgan, who began the first of his three-year tenure. The Pards had season home attendance of 37,786, an average of 619 per contest.

The Bismarck–Mandan Pards continued play in the 1963 Northern League, which was now designated as a Class A league. Jack Hoeven was replaced as team president by Roger Higgins, a radio and television sports director, who had played for the Bismarck Barons. The Pards finished with a 1963 regular season record of 56–63, placing third in the Northern League, with Vern Morgan continuing as manager. Season attendance at Bismarck Municipal Ballpark was 31,769, an average of 534 per game.

Playing their third season under Vern Morgan, the Bismarck–Mandan Pards of the Northern League finished the 1964 season with a record of 39–80. The team finished last in the six–team Northern League. The Pards drew a season attendance of 19,332. The franchise did not return to the Northern League in 1965, as the league reduced to four teams for the 1965 season.

The Bismarck–Mandan Pards returned to the Northern League in 1966 and played their final season. Bismarck-Mandan finished with a record of 16–47, placing sixth in the Northern League standings. Tony Pacheco was the 1966 manager. The final home season attendance at Bismarck Municipal Ballpark was 6,988, an average of 222 per contest. The Bismarck–Mandan Pards franchise folded after the season.

== The ballpark ==
Bismarck and Bismarck–Mandan minor league teams played home games at the Bismarck Municipal Ballpark. The ballpark reportedly had a capacity of 3,000 with dimensions (Left, Center, Right) of: 321–410–320. The ballpark was built in 1921. The original grandstand was reportedly destroyed by fire in 1971 and rebuilt. In 1992, Washington Street, which runs alongside the ballpark, was widened and as a result the ballfield was rotated, with a new concrete grandstand constructed. Still in use for baseball today by the Bismarck Larks, Bismarck Municipal Ballpark is located at 303 West Front Street, Bismarck, North Dakota.

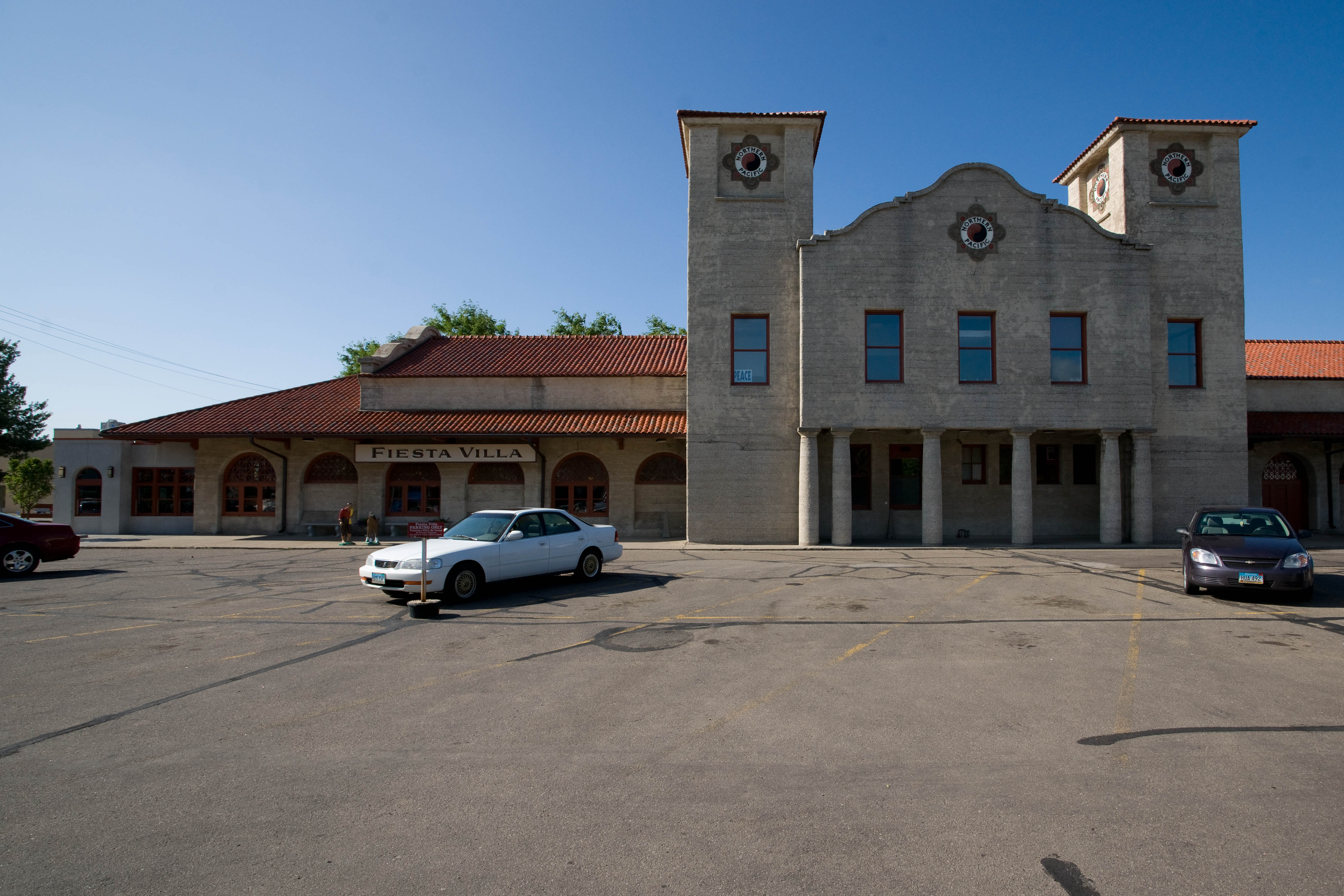
(2009) Northern Pacific Railway Depot. National Register of Historic Places. Bismarck, North Dakota.

== Timeline ==
Year(s)	# Yrs.	Team	Level	League	Affiliate	Ballpark
1922	1	Bismarck Capitals	Class D	Dakota League	None	Bismarck Municipal Ballpark
1923	1	Bismarck Capitals	Class D	North Dakota League	None	Bismarck Municipal Ballpark
1955–1957	3	Bismarck Barons	Independent	Manitoba-Dakota League	None	Bismarck Municipal Ballpark
1962	1	Bismarck–Mandan Pards	Class C	Northern League	Minnesota Twins	Bismarck Municipal Ballpark
1963–1964	2	Bismarck–Mandan Pards	Class A	Northern League	Minnesota Twins	Bismarck Municipal Ballpark
1966	1	Bismarck–Mandan Pards	Class A	Northern League	Houston Astros	Bismarck Municipal Ballpark

== Year–by–year records ==
Year	Record	Finish	Manager	Playoffs/Notes
1922	30–64	8th	Charlie Boardman / Ernie Menne / J.H. Sampson / Lou Bachant	Valley City (25–46) moved to Bismarck August 3
1923	26–42	4th	Tom Shanley / Mo McKnight	No playoffs held
1955	47–41	1st	Al Cihocki	League pennant Lost in 1st round
1956	47–41	2nd	Al Cihocki	Lost in 1st round
1957	38–33	1st	Bill Hockenbury	League champions
1962	60–62	3rd	Vern Morgan	Did not qualify
1963	56–63	3rd	Vern Morgan	No playoffs held
1964	39–80	6th	Vern Morgan	No playoffs held
1966	16–47	6th	Tony Pacheco	No playoffs held

== Notable alumni ==
- Ray Dandridge (1955) Inducted Baseball Hall of Fame, 1971
- Charlie Boardman (1922, MGR, 1923)
- Dave Boswell (1964)
- Bill Cash (1955)
- Al Cihocki (1955–1956, MGR)
- Jerry Crider (1962)
- Gary Gearhart (1955)
- Wally Gilbert (1922)
- Preston Gomez (1955)
- Tom Griffin (1966)
- Roric Harrison (1966)
- Ken Heintzelman (1955)
- Andy Kosco (1964)
- Fred Lasher (1962, 1964)
- Rudy May (1963) 1980 AL ERA Leader
- Walter McCoy (1955)
- John Michaelson (1922)
- Vern Morgan (1962–1964, MGR)
- Jim Ollom (1964)
- Art Pennington (1955–1956)
- Newt Randall (1923)
- Rich Reese (1963)
- Scipio Spinks (1966)
- Fred Stanley (1966)
- Otis Thornton (1966)
- Wayne Twitchell (1966)
- Fred Vaughn (1955)
- Bob Watkins (1966)
- Roy Weatherly (1955)

== See also ==
- Bismarck Barons players
- Bismarck Capitals players
- Bismarck-Mandan Pards players
