= Bismarck Municipal Ballpark =

- Location within North Dakota Location within the United States
- Interactive map of Bismarck Municipal Ballpark
- Full name: Bismarck Municipal Stadium, Home of Dakota Community Bank & Trust Field
- Address: 303 W. Front Ave. Bismarck, ND 58504
- Coordinates: 46°48′14″N 100°47′45″W
- Operator: Bismarck Parks and Recreation District
- Capacity: 1,900
- Surface: Grass
- Field size: Left field: 320 ft (98 m); Left center: 388 ft (118 m); Center field: 380 ft (120 m); Right center: 390 ft (120 m); Right field: 333 ft (101 m)
- Public transit: Bis-Man Transit

Construction
- Opened: 1921
- Renovated: 1992, 2014

Tenants
- Bismarck Capitals (DL/NDL) 1922–1923; Bismarck Governors (American Legion Lloyd Spetz Post No. 1) 1928–present Bismarck Churchills 1930s Bismarck Barons (MDL) 1955–1957; Bismarck-Mandan Pards (NL) 1962–1964, 1966; Bismarck Larks (NWL) 2017–present

Bismarck Municipal Stadium is a baseball stadium in Bismarck, North Dakota. Built in 1921, the stadium was reconfigured in 1992 and renovated again in 2014.

Since 1928, it has been home to the Bismarck Governors (American Legion Lloyd Spetz Post No. 1) team. In the 1930s, it was home to the Bismarck Churchills independent team, most famous for having Baseball Hall of Famer Satchel Paige leading its roster. It was also home to the minor league baseball teams, the Bismarck Capitals (1922–1923), Bismarck Barons (1955–1957) and Bismarck-Mandan Pards (1962–1964, 1966).

Currently, it is home to the Bismarck Larks of the Northwoods League, a collegiate summer baseball league.
