= 44th and Parkside Ballpark =

Former athletics field and ballpark in West Parkside, Philadelphia

44th and Parkside ballpark
- Interactive map of 44th and Parkside ballpark
- Full name: P.R.R. YMCA Athletic Field
- Location: Southwest corner, Belmont and Parkside Avenues; Philadelphia, Pennsylvania 19131; United States
- Coordinates: 39.9775°N 75.2138°W
- Owner: Pennsylvania Railroad
- Capacity: 6,000
- Surface: grass
- Field size: Left - 330 ft. Center - 410 ft. Right - 310 ft.

Construction
- Opened: May 2, 1903
- Expanded: 1920s

Tenants
- Pennsylvania Railroad YMCA of Philadelphia, 1903-1905; Philadelphia Stars, 1934-1949

The P.R.R. YMCA Athletic Field, also known as Penmar Park and commonly referred to in the 1930s and 1940s as the 44th and Parkside ballpark, was an athletic field and ballpark in West Philadelphia from as early as the 1890s to the early 1950s. It was built by the Pennsylvania Railroad YMCA for use by its employees. Behind the right-field fence stood the roundhouse of the main yard of the Pennsylvania Railroad. The Negro league baseball Philadelphia Stars played home games at the park from 1936 until 1952.

== PRR Football ==
The Pennsylvania Railroad supported its employees through its sponsorship of the Pennsylvania Railroad YMCA. Philadelphia's Pennsylvania Railroad YMCA building was located at 41st Street and Westminster Avenue in West Philadelphia and was dedicated in 1894. Also that year, the YMCA began to sponsor the Pennsylvania Railroad's employee football team which had existed since 1886. This Railroad-YMCA team played against local college and athletic club teams. Players were former college players employed by the Railroad. (A similar club composed of players who worked for the Pennsylvania Railroad's "Panhandle Division" in Ohio would enter the National Football League as the Columbus Panhandles.) The "Railroaders" played home games until 1902 at a field at 52nd and Jefferson Streets.

The YMCA maintained athletic fields at Belmont Avenue and Elm Street as early as the 1880s. The grounds were reported as renovated for the new season as early as 1891.

The YMCA dedicated the field at Belmont and Parkside Avenues on May 2, 1903.

== Community Use ==
The field was used as a multi-sport athletic field by the local community.

The Philadelphia College of Pharmacy held 1906 Commencement Week "Athletic Games" at the field. The College of Pharmacy's baseball team would face the New York College of Pharmacy's team in April 1910 at what was referred to as the "P.R.R. grounds".

A fire in 1922 prior to the start of the baseball season destroyed half the backstop and swept across the stands. The grandstand had not yet been repaired when Friends' Central School's baseball team opened its season against Chestnut Hill Academy on April 11, 1922.

The grandstands would be built out in the 1920s and lights were added in 1933. Ballpark capacity is said to have been 5,000 to 6,000 people. Overflow crowds brought attendance to 10,000.

During the 1930s, Overbrook High School and St. Joseph's Preparatory School played their home football games at the field, and Overbrook played baseball there. The independent Norfolk Black Bombers all-Black barnstorming football team played the Washington Willow Trees on Thanksgiving Day 1942 at the park. Stars co-owner Eddie Gottlieb organized a semi-professional baseball team called the "All-Phillies" which played at the field in its later years.

The Philadelphia Sphas, known for basketball, fielded a baseball club for many years as well, and often played at 44th and Parkside. In August 1933, the Sphas lost a night game 10 to 2 to the Pittsburgh Crawfords which featured four future Hall of Famers in the starting lineup, Cool Papa Bell, Oscar Charleston, Josh Gibson, and Judy Johnson.

The American League Philadelphia Athletics played their first ever night game on September 22, 1933 at 44th and Parkside, defeating a team of the best players in the semi-professional Philadelphia city league by a score of 7 to 2. It was estimated that 6,000 fans packed into the ballpark, and another 5,000 were turned away at the gate. Jimmie Foxx went 1 for 3 for the A's before leaving the game in the fifth inning.

== Philadelphia Stars Baseball ==
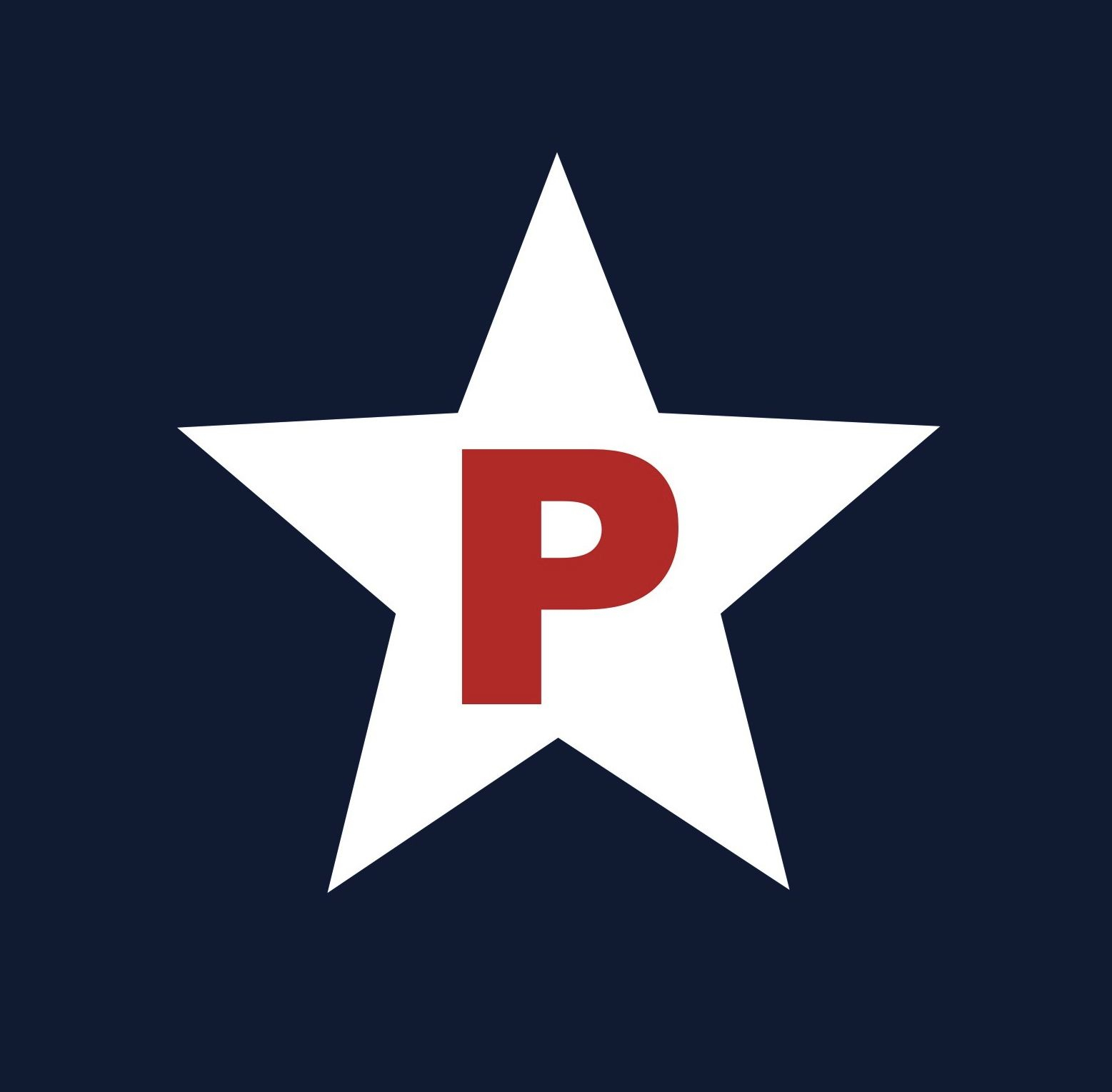
Philadelphia Stars Negro National League 1938 cap logo.

The Philadelphia Stars Negro league baseball team had been founded in 1933 by Ed Bolden and initially played their home games at Passon Field at the current site of West Philadelphia High School's Pollock Field.

The ballpark hosted Game 2, 6, and 7 of the 1935 Negro National League Championship Series, which matched the Pittsburgh Crawfords against the New York Cubans that saw the Crawfords overcome a 3-1 series deficit to win the league pennant.

In 1936, the Stars moved to 44th and Parkside Ballpark where they played the majority of their home games through 1947 when they lost their lease.

The ballpark was owned by the Pennsylvania Railroad and Stars co-owner Eddie Gottlieb leased it from the Railroad for the club. The Stars played their home games at the ballpark with the exception of Monday nights when the Stars would play in North Philadelphia at Shibe Park, home of the Philadelphia Athletics and starting in 1938, the Philadelphia Phillies.

Biographer Mark Ribowsky documented that Pittsburgh Crawfords catcher Josh Gibson hit a long home run in a game against the Stars early in the 1936 season that flew out of the ballpark.

The ballpark was home to another famous incident, in which Satchel Paige was working on a perfect game through eight innings pitching for the Stars in a non-league exhibition game. In the ninth, after three intentional walks, Paige was so sure of himself that he told his seven fielders to lie down on the field. Paige then struck out the side on nine pitches.

Negro World Series games were often played at neutral game-sites to attract larger crowds. The Cleveland Buckeyes beat the Homestead Grays in game 4 of the 1945 Series at 44th and Parkside. Game 3 of the 1947 Series was also played at the Park in which the Buckeyes faced the New York Cubans.

The ballpark remained sturdy despite a woman named Miss Hattie Williams chopping wood from the grandstand with a hatchet to heat the washtub where she cooked the hot dogs for her concession stand behind home plate.

Stars player Stanley Glenn recalled the smoke and soot from the coal-powered locomotives in the train yard behind right field forcing the Stars to stop games until the smoke would clear. The field was rarely manicured and the grass grew high.

== Negro League Memorial Park and Mural ==
African American Baseball in Philadelphia
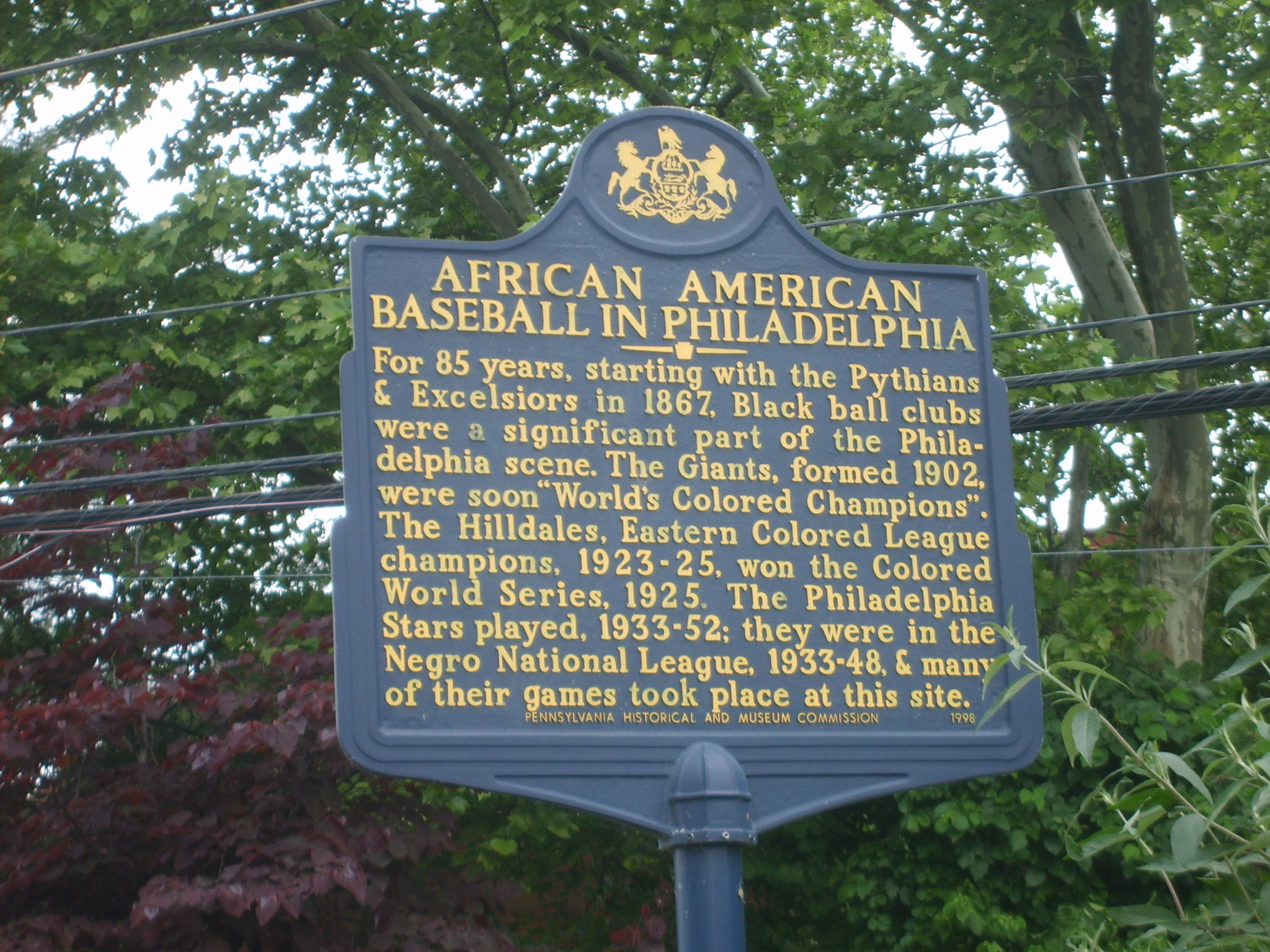
- "African American Baseball in Philadelphia", Pennsylvania Historical and Museum Commission, (1998) at Belmont and Parkside Avenues, Philadelphia, PA 19131 photographed May 24, 2011.

- Location within Philadelphia
- 39.9775°N 75.2138°W
- Location: SW corner, Belmont & Parkside Aves., Philadelphia

Today at 44th and Parkside is the Philadelphia Stars Negro League Memorial Park.

In 2004, West Philadelphia's Business Association of West Parkside led a coalition of local groups in building the park. The Philadelphia Building Trades Council donated $150,000 in labor for construction. A black-tie dinner was held on September 2, 2004 at the Mann Center for the Performing Arts, near the site of the ballpark, to raise money for the Memorial Park. The dinner honored former players Bill Cash, Stanley Glenn, Harold Gould, and Wilmer Harris.

At the site of the Park are three tributes to the Philadelphia Stars and Negro leagues' baseball in Philadelphia. There is a Pennsylvania Historic Site marker, a Negro Leagues Memorial Statue, and Philadelphia MuralArts program mural celebrating the Stars. The Stars Memorial Park and the Stars Mural straddle either side of Belmont Avenue as one crosses Parkside Avenue traveling west.

A Pennsylvania Historical marker was dedicated at Belmont and Parkside Avenues on April 25, 1998. The marker is titled, "African American Baseball in Philadelphia" and the text reads,

For 85 years, starting with the Pythians and Excelsiors in 1867, Black ball clubs were a significant part of the Philadelphia scene. The Giants, formed 1902, were soon "World's Colored Champions." The Hilldales, Eastern Colored League Champions, 1923-25, won the Colored World Series, 1925. The Philadelphia Stars from 1933-52; they were in the Negro National League, 1933-48, & many of their games took place at this site.

=== Memorial Statue ===
A 7-foot high statue featuring a ballplayer following through on his swing stands in the Memorial Park. The Phillies hosted the dedication of the statue on June 18, 2003 at Veterans Stadium. Mayor John Street and Phillies shortstop Jimmy Rollins attended the unveiling of the statue, along with the then living members of the Stars, Bill Cash, Mahlon Duckett, Stanley Glenn, Harold Gould, and Wilmer Harris. The Phillies committed to pay for the maintenance and upkeep of the statue for a period of 10 years.

The statue was unveiled and placed upon its pedestal at 44th and Belmont Avenues on April 15, 2005. Cash, Duckett, Gould, and Glenn all attended the ceremony. Wilmer Harris had died in December 2004. Phillies hitting coach Milt Thompson, whose father and grandfather played in the Negro leagues, attended as did Rollins and former Phillies player Garry Maddox.

The statue was sculpted by artist and Philadelphia native Phil Sumpter. Sumpter also designed the Judy Johnson statue at Wilmington's Frawley Stadium and a Roberto Clemente statue which stands at Third and Erie Streets in Philadelphia.

=== Mural ===
Across Belmont Avenue from the Memorial Park is the mural "Philadelphia Stars: a tribute to Negro League baseball". The mural is part of the Philadelphia Mural Arts Program. It was painted by Philadelphia artist David McShane, and dedicated on September 19, 2006. The mural has been described as an "impressionistic collage of scenes"; McShane consulted with surviving Stars players on their memories of the ballpark before creating the work. The mural was sponsored by the Pennsylvania Horticultural Society's Philadelphia Green Program, the Philadelphia Department of Human Services, the Neighborhood Transformation Initiative, and the Business Association of West Parkside (which had also organized the creation of the Memorial Park). Former Stars players Glenn, Gould, Cash, and Duckett attended the dedication, as well as Phillies players Michael Bourn, Chris Roberson, and the artist McShane.

== See also ==
- Philadelphia Stars
- Hilldale Park
