= New Rockford-Carrington Twins =

- 1923; New Rockford, North Dakota

Minor league affiliations
- Class: Class D (1923)
- League: North Dakota League (1923)

Major league affiliations
- Team: None

Minor league titles
- League titles (0): None

Team data
- Name: New Rockford-Carrington Twins (1923); Valley City Hi-Liners (1923)
- Ballpark: Eddy County Fairgrounds* (1923)

The New Rockford-Carrington Twins were a minor league baseball team based in New Rockford, North Dakota in partnership with Carrington, North Dakota. In 1923, the New Rockford-Carrington Twins briefly played as members of the North Dakota League, before the team relocated to become the Valley City Hi-Liners during the season.

== History ==
The 1923 New Rockford-Carrington Twins began the season as charter members of the four–team Class D level North Dakota League. The New Rockford-Carrington franchise moved to Valley City, North Dakota on July 17, 1923 to become the Valley City Hi-Liners.

The New Rockford-Carrington/Valley City team was managed by Earl Pickering and placed third in the final North Dakota State League standings with a combined regular season record of 30–38. The New Rockford-Carrington/Valley City team finished 17.5 games behind the first place Minot Magicians, 2.5 games behind the second place Jamestown Jimkotas and 4.0 games ahead of the 4th place Bismarck Capitals.

The North Dakota League permanently folded after the 1923 season. The New Rockford, North Dakota and Carrington, North Dakota cities have not hosted another minor league team.

== The ballpark ==
The name of the New Rockford-Carrington home minor league ballpark is not directly referenced. References indicate the team played in New Rockford, North Dakota at the ballpark located at 8th Street South & 7th Avenue South, which today is the site of the Eddy County Fairgrounds.

The Valley City Hi-Liners were noted to have played home minor league games at Pioneer Park.

== Year-by-year record ==
Year	Record	Finish	Manager	Playoffs/notes
1923	30–38	3rd	Earl Pickering	Moved to Valley City July 17

== Notable alumni ==
- Charlie Boardman (1923)
- Frank Jude (1923)

== See also ==
New Rockford-Carrington Twins players
