= Irvin Castille =

American baseball player

- Shortstop / Third baseman
- Born: May 17, 1926; Lafayette, Louisiana, U.S.
- Died: August 4, 2015 (aged 89); Whittier, California, U.S.
- Batted: Right Threw: Right

Teams
- Birmingham Black Barons (1951–1953); Brandon Greys (1952)

Career highlights and awards
- East–West All-Star Game selection (1953)

Irvin Castille (May 17, 1926 – August 4, 2015) was an American shortstop and third baseman who played from 1951 through 1953 in the Negro American League. Born in Lafayette, Louisiana, he batted and threw right handed.

Castille joined the Birmingham Black Barons in the dying years of the Negro leagues. He also was selected to the East–West All-Star Game in 1953. In between, he played with the Brandon Greys club of the independent Mandak League in its 1952 season.

On June 8, 2008, Major League Baseball staged a special draft of the surviving Negro league players, doing a tribute for the surviving Negro leaguers who were kept out of the Big Leagues because of their race. MLB clubs each selected a former NLB player, as Castille was drafted by the Oakland Athletics.

A week later, the San Diego Padres honored him during a homestand highlighted by a Salute to the Negro leagues, fireworks and U.S. Army Appreciation Day at Petco Park. Late in the month, he signed autographs and shared stories about his playing days in the Times of Greatness Mobile event held at the Museum of Contemporary Art, Chicago.

Castille was a long resident of Whittier, California, where he died in 2015 at the age of 83.
