= Jeff Lindgren =

American baseball player (born 1996)

Bravos de León – No. 18
- Pitcher
- Born: September 17, 1996 (age 29); Champaign, Illinois, U.S.
- Bats: Right Throws: Right

MLB debut
- April 3, 2023, for the Miami Marlins

MLB statistics (through 2023 season)
- Win–loss record: 0–0
- Earned run average: 5.14
- Strikeouts: 1
- Stats at Baseball Reference

Teams
- Miami Marlins (2023)

Jeff Thomas Lindgren (born September 17, 1996) is an American professional baseball pitcher for the Bravos de León of the Mexican League. He has previously played in Major League Baseball (MLB) for the Miami Marlins.

== Career ==
=== Amateur ===
Lindgren attended Champaign Centennial High School in Champaign, Illinois, and Illinois State University, where he played college baseball for the Illinois State Redbirds.

In the 2017 and 2018 seasons, Lindgren played for the Bismarck Larks of the Northwoods League, soon becoming the first Lark alumnus to play in the majors.

=== Miami Marlins ===
The Miami Marlins selected Lindgren in the 24th round, 711th overall, of the 2019 Major League Baseball draft. He spent his first professional season with the Low-A Batavia Muckdogs and High-A Jupiter Hammerheads, posting a cumulative 2–2 record and 1.27 ERA with 26 strikeouts in 28.1 innings pitched across 16 total appearances. He did not play in a game in 2020 due to the cancellation of the minor league season because of the COVID-19 pandemic.

In 2021, he pitched in 20 games (starting 19) for the Double-A Pensacola Blue Wahoos, registering a 6–8 record and 3.82 ERA with 85 strikeouts in 106.0 innings pitched. Lindgren split the 2022 season between Pensacola and the Triple-A Jacksonville Jumbo Shrimp, starting 27 games and logging a 7–4 record and 4.21 ERA with 116 strikeouts in 136.2 innings of work.

On April 3, 2023, Lindgren was selected to the 40-man roster and promoted to the major leagues for the first time. He made his MLB debut that night against the Minnesota Twins, allowing 4 earned runs on 4 hits in 5.0 innings pitched. He was designated for assignment by Miami the following day, after Daniel Castano had his contract selected. He cleared waivers and was sent outright to Triple-A Jacksonville on April 6. On April 22, Lindgren had his contract selected back to the active roster, permitting him to serve as the 27th man for the team’s doubleheader against the Cleveland Guardians. He was designated for assignment without appearing in a game on April 24. He cleared waivers and was again sent outright to Jacksonville on April 26.

On July 2, Lindgren was selected back to the major league roster. He made two more appearances, tossing two scoreless innings with one strikeout against the St. Louis Cardinals. On July 7, he was again designated for assignment following the promotion of Robert Garcia. He again cleared waivers and was sent outright to Triple–A Jacksonville on July 9. On September 23, Lindgren once more had his contract selected by the Marlins. Following the season on October 31, Lindgren was removed from the 40–man roster and sent outright to Triple–A Jacksonville.

Lindgren began the 2024 campaign with Pensacola, and also appeared for Jacksonville, compiling a cumulative 2–5 record and 6.19 ERA with 70 strikeouts. On September 12, 2024, the Marlins selected Lindgren's contract, adding him to their active roster. He did not appear for Miami and was designated for assignment on September 18. Lindgren cleared waivers and was sent outright to Jacksonville on September 20. He elected free agency on October 10.

=== Chicago Dogs ===
On April 14, 2025, Lindgren signed with the Chicago Dogs of the American Association of Professional Baseball. In 11 starts for Chicago, Lindgren compiled a 5-2 record and 3.41 ERA with 66 strikeouts across 60 2/3 innings pitched.

=== Bravos de León ===
On July 11, 2025, Lindgren signed with the Bravos de León of the Mexican League. In 3 starts 13 innings he went 0-1 with an 8.31 ERA with more walks (9) than strikeouts (2).
