= Wilmer Harris =

Negro league baseball
- Pitcher
- Born: March 1, 1924; Philadelphia
- Died: December 23, 2004 (aged 80); Philadelphia
- Batted: Right Threw: Right

Career statistics
- Win–loss record: 120–45
- Winning percentage: .727
- Stats at Baseball Reference

Teams
- Philadelphia Stars (1945–1952)

Career highlights and awards
- 2× All-Star (1951–1952)

Wilmer Joseph Harris (March 1, 1924 – December 23, 2004) was an American pitcher who played in Negro league baseball. Listed at 6' 0", 175 lb., he batted and threw right-handed.

== Biography ==
Born in Philadelphia, Wilmer Harris started playing sandlot ball at an early age with the boys of his neighborhood. He attended Central High School for Boys, where he graduated in 1941. In addition, he served as captain for the school's baseball and basketball teams and also played for the Passon Stars club of the Fairmount Park League, which won four straight championships.

Harris threw left-handed and batted right-handed. He was known as having a fearsome curveball. He entered the league in 1945 with the Philadelphia Stars, playing for them his entire eight-year career through 1952. In his debut, he faced pitching legend Satchel Paige and the Kansas City Monarchs before a 40000 crowd in the original Yankee Stadium. Late in the year, he struck out Jackie Robinson, by then a rookie who was pinch-hitting for the Monarchs.

The highlight of his career came in 1946, while pitching against the Newark Eagles at Connie Mack Stadium. With the bases loaded and no outs, Harris struck out in order three of the greatest hitters in Negro League history: Larry Doby, Lennie Pearson and Monte Irvin, to preserve the victory for his team.

In 1947, after the Major League Baseball season ended, Harris played for an All-Star team led by Jackie Robinson, composed of Robinson and other Negro League relevant players. He ended his career with the Stars in 1952, posting a career total of 120 wins and 45 losses for a solid .727 winning percentage.

A two-time NBL All-Star, Harris hurled the last three innings for the East Division in the 1951 East–West All-Star Game, allowing two hits without walks or runs while striking out four batters. He earned the save in a 3–1 victory. In 1952, his last season, he pitched again three innings of shutout ball in the East–West Game, surrendering two hits with a walk and did not have a strikeout in a 7–3 loss.

Besides this, he also played winter baseball in the professional leagues of Panama (1945), Venezuela (1949) and Dominican Republic (1950).

While playing winter baseball in Venezuela, he made the Caracas All-Star team. While in spring training for Milwaukee Braves (1951), he pulled a shoulder muscle, causing him to miss out on his bid in the major leagues. He was able to return to the Negro League to finish the season. His last season with Philadelphia Stars was 1952. He continued playing in Canada (1954) and lead the St. Thomas Elgins (Ontario, Canada) to league championship. This was the last year he played professional baseball.

After retiring from baseball, he worked in Jenkintown for SPS Technologies for 37 years, retiring as a supervisor in 1989. He then was employed at Allied Securities Service in Philadelphia for 12 years.

Wilmer Harris died in 2004 in his hometown of Philadelphia at the age of 80. At the time of his death, he was one of only five surviving members of the Philadelphia Stars. At the time of his death, he was survived by his sister, Alberta Harris; his children, Carolyn Carter, Denise Owens, Sherri Harris-Mitchell, Nicholas Kennedy-Harris, and Michaila (Kennedy-Harris) Troutner; and his grandchildren, Helena Carter-Crumety, Kevin Carter, Kurtis Carter, Kelli Carter, Rashieda Lane-Smith and Krystal Harris.

== See also ==
- List of Negro league baseball players
