= Goose Curry =

American baseball player

- Outfielder
- Born: May 19, 1905; Mexia, Texas, U.S.
- Died: March 30, 1974 (aged 68); Memphis, Tennessee, U.S.
- Batted: Left Threw: Right

Negro league baseball debut
- 1928, for the Cleveland Tigers

Last appearance
- 1947, for the Philadelphia Stars
- Stats at Baseball Reference
- Managerial record at Baseball Reference

Teams
- Cleveland Tigers (1928); Memphis Red Sox (1929–1934); Monroe Monarchs (1932); Nashville Elite Giants (1933); Washington Elite Giants (1936); Indianapolis Athletics (1937); Kansas City Monarchs (1937); Memphis Red Sox (1937); New York Black Yankees (1938–1940); Baltimore Elite Giants (1940–1941); Philadelphia Stars (1942–1947)

Homer Curry (May 19, 1905 – March 30, 1974), nicknamed "Goose", was an American Negro league outfielder and manager from the 1920s to the 1940s.

A native of Mexia, Texas, Curry made his Negro leagues debut in 1928 with the Cleveland Tigers. He went on to have a 20-year Negro league playing career, and also managed the Memphis Red Sox and Philadelphia Stars. Curry died in Memphis, Tennessee in 1974 at age 68.
