= Harold Gould (baseball) =

American baseball player

- Pitcher
- Born: September 29, 1924; Gouldtown, Fairfield, New Jersey
- Died: November 9, 2012 (aged 88); Gouldtown, Fairfield, New Jersey
- Batted: Right Threw: Right

Negro leagues debut
- 1947, for the Philadelphia Stars

Last Provincial League appearance
- 1949, for the Farnham Pirates
- Stats at Baseball Reference

Teams
- Philadelphia Stars (NNL) (1947–1948); Farnham Pirates (QPL) (1949)

Harold Lorenzo Gould, Sr. (September 29, 1924 – November 9, 2012) was a baseball pitcher with the Philadelphia Stars in the Negro leagues from 1947 to 1948. The right-hander won 19 games over the two seasons including an impressive rookie campaign with 14 victories.

He also played for the Farnham Pirates in the Quebec Provincial League in 1949. Gould's time as a pitcher ended when he was drafted for military service and sent to Korea prior to the 1950 season.

Gould was a welder by profession, beginning by working on ships in Camden and then New York City. He opened up his own shop in New Jersey called Harold's Welding Service in 1964.

Gould was elected to the New Jersey Hall of Fame in 1994 and the South Jersey Hall of Fame in 2001. He was named one of Cumberland County's “People of the Century” in 1999 and was named to the county's Black Hall of Fame in 2009. In 2008, Gould was selected by the Toronto Blue Jays in a special Major League draft of surviving Negro league players held to acknowledge and rectify their exclusion from the major leagues on the basis of race.

Gould was active in retirement in publicizing the legacy of the Philadelphia Stars and Negro league baseball in Philadelphia. He participated in events at the Phillies' Citizens Bank Park and at the annual Jackie Robinson Day celebration at the site of the Star's former ballpark at 44th and Parkside Avenue.

== Sources ==
- Gould, Harold; Allen, Bob (2009). He Came From Gouldtown. Privately Published (Unlisted).
