= Andrew Porter (baseball) =

American baseball player (1910–2010)

- Pitcher
- Born: March 7, 1910; Little Rock, Arkansas, US
- Died: July 1, 2010 (aged 100); Los Angeles, California, US
- Batted: Right Threw: Right

Teams
- Cleveland Cubs (1932); Louisville Black Caps (1932); Nashville Elite Giants (1932–1934); Columbus Elite Giants (1935); Washington Elite Giants (1936–1937); Baltimore Elite Giants (1938); Alijadores de Tampico (1939); Leopardos de Santa Clara (1939); Tecolotes de Nuevo Laredo (1940); Alacranes de Almendares (1940); Tecolotes de Nuevo Laredo (1940); Alacranes de Almendares (1940); Diablos Rojos del México (1941); Azules de Veracruz (1942–1943); Baltimore Elite Giants (1942–1946); Newark Eagles (1947); Indianapolis Clowns 1948–1949); Sabios de Vargas (1949); Winnipeg Buffaloes (1950); Porterville Comets (1952); Carman Cardinals (1952–1953)

Career highlights and awards
- Negro National League pennant title (1939); Four-time East–West All-Star Game selections (1934–1935; 1937; 1949); Mexican League All-Star Game (1939); 2008 MLB special draft of the surviving Negro league players (selected by the Los Angeles Dodgers)

Andrew Porter (March 7, 1910 – July 1, 2010) was an American pitcher in Negro league baseball and Minor League Baseball. Listed at 6 ft 4 in (1.93 m), 190 pounds (86 kg), Porter batted and threw right-handed.

He was born in Little Rock, Arkansas. Colloquially known as 'Andy Pullman' because he worked as hard as a Pullman porter, he was noted for his overpowering fastball and a hard-to-hit slider.

Porter joined the Negro Baseball leagues in 1932 and retired in 1954 after a 22-year career, playing for several teams all over the country and even outside its borders, in Canada Cuba, Mexico and Venezuela.

== Career ==
Porter started his career with the Cleveland Cubs in 1932, pitching for them briefly before joining the Louisville Black Caps and then moving across the league to finish the season with the Nashville Elite Giants, the franchise for which Porter would play the majority of his Negro league career. Porter, along with Bill Byrd and Jonas Gaines, formed part of the Big Three on the Elite Giants' pitching staff.

For the next six seasons Porter was a mainstay pitcher for the Elite Giants, which became rather nomadic, moving from Nashville, Tennessee to Columbus, Ohio in 1935 and to Washington D.C. in 1936, before landing finally in Baltimore, Maryland in 1938.

As a 22-year-rookie, Porter had a 1–3 record in four games in 1933, improving to a 8–6 mark and a 3.53 ERA in a 18-game campaign in 1934, when he was selected for the East–West All-Star Game after collecting the second-highest vote total of any Elite Giants player, although he did not appear in the game. During the off-season, he pitched particularly well in the California Winter League, going 12–3 for the Giants, including 66 strikeouts while allowing only 21 walks in 122.0 innings of work.

In 1935, Porter lost a significant part of the season due to an illness. Nevertheless, he was impressive enough during the remainder of the year, going 3–1 with a 2.73 ERA in six appearances and earning a repeat selection to the East–West All-Star Game, but he was not used in the game.

Afterwards, Porter had two subpar seasons, going 3–3 with a 5.75 ERA in 1936 and 1–6, 4.66 in 1937, being selected for the East–West All-Star Game in this last season. Once more, Porter did not appear in the game, but he was persistent and would show his skills in other significant showcase games. It came in October 1936 during an exhibition series, when Porter faced an all-white, All-Star team that included future Hall of Famers Rogers Hornsby and Johnny Mize, as he was 1–1 with a 3.00 ERA in two appearances. In Game 2, he hurled four innings with one earned run while striking out eight, including Hornsby twice. Unfortunately, Porter charged with the loss after an unearned run was scored on two errors in the ninth inning. In Game 5, he was credited with the win in six innings of relief for the starter Satchel Paige, allowing just two runs and retiring Hornsby and Mize with the bases loaded in the fifth inning.

Porter stayed with the Elite Giants in 1938, posting a 4–1 record and 2.57 ERA in six games (five starts) before jumping to the Mexican League the following spring, when he joined the Alijadores de Tampico in 1939. Overall, Porter finished with a 10–7 record and a 2.28 ERA for Tampico, leading the league with 111 strikeouts while pitching in the inaugural Mexican League All-Star Game played on August 29 in Mexico City. During the winter, he traveled to Cuba and went 3–4 for the Leopardos de Santa Clara club.

Meanwhile, a Negro league baseball ban on players who jumped to Mexico had been clarified before the 1940 season as a three-year suspension. As a result, Porter returned for a second season in the Mexican League in 1940. He then shifted to the Tecolotes de Nuevo Laredo, where he became a real workhorse, appearing in nearly half of his team's games and winning 21 of their 39 victories while ending with a 3.34 ERA. Furthermore, he led the league with 27 complete games, 296 innings pitched, 232 strikeouts, and 125 walks, each of which were at the time league records. The strikeout record would last 12 years before Cuban pitcher Lino Donoso broke it in 1954. After that, Porter pitched in the 1940–1941 Cuban Winter League season. He went 6–5 for the Alacranes de Almendares, a team that otherwise finished last with a disappointing record of 20–26 in the four-team league.

But Porter slowed his performance in 1941 with the Diablos Rojos del México, posting a 11–16 record and a 4.47 ERA. Although he led the league with 133 strikeouts, Porter had problems with his control and gave up 116 walks in 235 1/3 innings.

In 1942, Negro league baseball rescinded their ban on players in Mexico, and Porter returned to the Elite Giants in the spring. He had a 7–1 record with the Elites, but after joining the Azules de Veracruz in the Mexican League, he continued struggling with his control and dropped to a 5–8 record with a 5.66 ERA and only 47 strikeouts to 81 walks.

The following season Porter appeared in only three games without a decision for Veracruz, before rejoining the Elite Giants through the remainder of 1943. He went 2–3 with a 6.17 ERA in nine games.

Upon his return to the Elites, Porter recovered his form and won 3 of his 4 decisions in 1944, and followed in 1945 with a perfect 7–0 record and a 3.38 ERA in 11 games, including two shutouts, leading the league in winning percentage and showing good control while striking out 30 batters and walking 18 in 81 2/3 innings.

In 1946, his last year with the Elite Giants, Porter was 5–5 with a 4.30 ERA in 13 games, including 47 strikeouts to 23 walks in 90.0 innings. This renewed success drew the attention of Nuevo Laredo and Porter returned briefly to Mexico, going 2–2 with a 5.12 ERA for the Tecolotes in 1947.

Thereafter, Porter returned to the Negro leagues and played briefly with the Newark Eagles in 1947 and for the Indianapolis Clowns over the course of three seasons from 1948 to 1950. He posted a 4–5 mark with a 4.68 ERA in 1948, improved to a 10–6 record with a 3.64 ERA in 1949, and appeared in only three games in 1950, winning his only two decisions. At this time, he finally made an All-Star appearance at age 38, pitching three hitless innings for the East team and combining with two other pitchers to hold the West squad on two hits in a 4–0 shutout in the 1949 East–West All-Star Game. Porter was preceded by Bob Griffith and followed by Pat Scantlebury, who allowed two singles in the final three innings.

In between, Porter played winter ball with the Sabios de Vargas club of the Venezuelan League in its 1949–1950 season. He posted a 5–6 record and a 5.26 ERA in 18 appearances, including 12 starts and five complete games, but struggled with his control throughout the season while allowing 60 walks and striking out 37 in 101.0 innings. After that, he pitched briefly for the Winnipeg Buffaloes of the Mandak League in the summer of 1950.

Following a year off, Porter joined the Porterville Comets of the Southwest International League in 1952; being part of the first all-black team to play in Minor League Baseball as well as one of the first clubs with an African American manager. Porter was slated to hold the second slot on the pitching staff behind player-manager Chet Brewer and, despite his age of 41, enthusiastically was well above average in the six-team league, posting a 3–5 mark and a 4.27 ERA in 78.0 innings of work. He spent his final playing days in the Mandak League with the Carman Cardinals, appearing for them over part of two seasons spanning 1952–1953.

== Retirement ==
After baseball, Porter began working for Goodyear Rubber Company in 1954. He retired in 1977 and moved to Los Angeles, California.

Prior to the start of the 2008 MLB draft, Major League Baseball held a special draft of the surviving Negro league players to acknowledge and rectify their exclusion from the major leagues on the basis of race. The idea of the special draft was conceived by Hall of Famer Dave Winfield, well known for his exceptional community service through the years. Every MLB team participated in the selection process, as 'Andy Pullman' was drafted as a pitcher by the Los Angeles Dodgers. At first, Porter had no idea about it, but then he saw recognition in his eyes. He was ill at the time of the ceremony, but received recognition in absentia.

Porter died in 2010 in Los, Angeles, California. At the time of his death, he was the second oldest living Negro League ballplayer after Emilio 'Millito' Navarro.

== Notes ==
Social Security Death Index and Porter's grave marker both give Porter's birth year as 1910. Porter's birth year is elsewhere listed as 1911. In the 1920 U.S. Census, Porter is listed as age 10 when enumerated on January 12, 1920. This more closely aligns with the 1910 birth year.
