= Bill Cash (baseball) =

- Catcher
- Born: February 21, 1919; Round Oak, Georgia, U.S.
- Died: September 12, 2011 (aged 92); Philadelphia, Pennsylvania, U.S.
- Batted: Right Threw: Right

Negro league baseball debut
- 1943, for the Philadelphia Stars

Last appearance
- 1949, for the Philadelphia Stars

Career statistics
- Batting average: .274
- Home runs: 8
- Runs batted in: 131
- Stats at Baseball Reference

Teams
- Philadelphia Stars (1943–1949)

William Walker Cash (February 21, 1919 – September 12, 2011), nicknamed "Ready", was an American professional baseball player who became an all-star catcher in the Negro leagues. He batted and threw right-handed. Cash earned his nickname when he was benched and protested to a team manager, "When I put on the uniform, I'm ready to play".

Cash spent his entire Negro league career with the Philadelphia Stars. He also played minor league baseball for the Chicago White Sox's farm teams and teams in Mexico, Canada, and Venezuela (Guerilus). After his retirement from baseball, Cash was an active member of the Philadelphia community

== Early life ==
Cash was born to Arthur "Buster" Cash and Lela Lloyd Cash in 1919. He was born in Round Oak, Georgia. The family moved to an area of Philadelphia called Eastwick-Elmwood in 1924. his family lived in the Meadows area near the Philadelphia International Airport. Cash graduated from Overbrook High School in Philadelphia in 1939. At Overbrook, Cash was the only black player on the baseball and he quit the squad to play semi-pro ball elsewhere.

Cash spent four years playing for semi-pro teams in Philadelphia, including the Camden Giants, the Black Meteors, and the Philadelphia Daisies (Negro Leagues Baseball Museum). Webster McDonald, manager of the Daisies, introduced Cash to Goose Curry, manager of the Philadelphia Stars, when he felt that Cash was ready to move up (Negro Leagues Baseball Museum). Curry ended up signing Cash to play for him.

== Negro league career ==
Cash began to play for the Philadelphia Stars in 1943. His batting average coming out of the semi-pros was .321, but he only batted .258 during his rookie season in the Negro league. His reputation was tarnished on Opening Day in 1946 during an argument with an umpire. In the skirmish, the umpire fell and while he was on his hands and knees, an angry Goose Curry, stormed the field and kicked him. Cash was suspended for three days and fined $25 for his role in the incident.

Cash was slated to catch for Satchel Paige's barnstorming All-Star team in 1946, but could not due to a broken thumb. He did participate in the East-West All-Star games of 1948 and 1949. Cash began the 1948 game as a substitute, but caught the entire game in 1949 in which he called the pitches as the East held a two-hit shutout of the West All-Stars.

== Minor league career ==
Cash's Negro league career came to an end in 1950 when he left the Stars only a few games into the season to join the Mexico City Red Devils. In Mexico, he batted .311, higher than any year he played with the Stars, and registered 15 home runs. Later, Cash went on to play for the Granby Red Sox in the Provincial League of Canada, batting .296 with 16 home runs.

Cash signed with Chicago White Sox in 1952, hoping to play for their major league team, but was relegated to their farm teams instead. Cash claimed that the White Sox organization promised him a Class A position, but he was given a Class B position instead. He split the season with the Superior Blues in Superior, Wisconsin, (where he spent less than 10 games) and the Waterloo White Hawks in Waterloo, Iowa. He suffered more injuries throughout the 1952 season, battling bursitis in his shoulder and a broken leg.

Cash hit .347, his highest batting average yet, with the Brandon Braves in 1953. For the next three years he played in the Dominican Republic for the Licey Tigers. Cash ended his baseball career in Bismarck, North Dakota, playing alongside other Negro league greats such as Ray Dandridge and Art Pennington. During his last season, he had a career-high batting average of .369.

== Personal life ==
Cash met and fell in love with Sadie Bell Brooks in 1940. The couple married on September 7, 1940. They also had three children, William W. Cash Jr., Janet Cash, and Michael Cash. They were married for 63 years. His family was a great source of his pride.

After Cash retired from baseball in 1955, he took a job at Westinghouse Electric, where he worked as a machinist for 30 years. It was a job that he enjoyed because he was training to become a machinist before he started to play baseball. He retired from Westinghouse in 1985.

Cash was also very active in his local community, particularly with a dedication to helping the youth of Philadelphia. He was the founder of the Cobbs Creek Little League Association and vice president of the Foundation for Juvenile Decency. In addition to those positions, he also founded the Parkway Little League and served on the board of directors for the Negro League Baseball Players Association. He often spoke at schools, churches, and other venues about his life as a baseball player and what hurdles African Americans must overcome in America (Guerilus). Cash also contributed to the foundation of a group called Concerned Black Men who worked with the needy children of Philadelphia (Sports Reference LLC).

Cash also held several positions as a clergyman in Philadelphia. He was a deacon at the Calvary Baptist Church in Philadelphia and later became a senior deacon at the First African Baptist Church in Sharon Hill, Pennsylvania, where he served for 30 years (Guerilus).

== Awards and recognition ==
Cash was inducted into the National Negro League Baseball Museum of History in 1981 (Hunt). He and other Negro league veterans were honored by President Bill Clinton at the White House in 1994 (Hunt). He was also honored by the City of Philadelphia, the National Baseball Hall of Fame at Cooperstown, New York and the African American Museum in Philadelphia.

Cash also made the 2006 Special Committee on the Negro league's preliminary ballot (Sports Reference LLC). He and Philadelphia Stars teammate Stanley Glenn were honored by the Philadelphia Phillies at Citizens Bank Park on June 5, 2008, where they were both presented with Phillies jerseys (Hunt). Cash resides in the Douglas, Cheyney University, and Delaware County Halls of Fame (Negro Leagues Baseball Museum).

Cash died on September 12, 2011, in Philadelphia, at the age of 92.
