= North Dakota League =

- Formerly: South Dakota League
- Classification: Class D (1923)
- Sport: Minor League Baseball
- First season: 1923
- Folded: 1923
- President: Logan Powell (1923)
- No. of teams: 4
- Country: United States of America
- Most titles: 1 Minot Magicians (1923)
- Related competitions: Mandak League

The North Dakota League was a Minor League Baseball league which operated in five North Dakota cities in 1923. The Class D level league had four teams at the start of its season, with one team relocating in July. The league evolved from the South Dakota League, with the Minot Magicians winning the 1923 championship.

== 1923 North Dakota League teams ==
- Bismarck, North Dakota: Bismarck Capitals
- Jamestown, North Dakota: Jamestown Jimkotas
- Minot, North Dakota: Minot Magicians
- New Rockford, North Dakota & Carrington, North Dakota: New Rockford-Carrington Twins
- Valley City, North Dakota: Valley City Hi-Liners

== Standings & statistics ==
=== 1923 North Dakota League ===
schedule

Team standings	W	L	PCT	GB	Managers
Minot Magicians	48	21	.696	-	Herb Hester
Jamestown Jimkotas	32	35	.478	15	Ed Whiting / Henry Wingfield
New Rockford-Carrington Twins / Valley City Hi-Liners	30	38	.441	17½	Earl Pickering
Bismarck Capitals	26	42	.382	21½	Tom Shanley / Mo McKnight

Note: New Rockford/Carrington relocated to Valley City on July 17, 1923.

Player statistics
Player	Team	Stat	Tot
Harry Wingfield	Jamestown	BA	.402
Fred Gunther	Minot	Hits	88
Albert Chenoweth	Jamestown	Hits	88
George Coleman	Minot	Runs	72
Albert Wenz	Jamestown	HR	6
Henry Oliver	Minot	HR	6
