= Skeeter Watkins =

American baseball player

- Third baseman
- Born: October 16, 1915; Towson, Maryland, U.S.
- Died: March 26, 1987 (aged 71); Bolton Hill, Maryland, U.S.
- Batted: Left Threw: Right

Negro league baseball debut
- 1942, for the Newark Eagles

Last appearance
- 1950, for the Philadelphia Stars

Teams
- Newark Eagles (1942–1946); Philadelphia Stars (1949–1950)

Maurice "Murray" Clifton Watkins (October 16, 1915 – March 26, 1987), nicknamed "Skeeter", was an American Negro league baseball third baseman in the 1940s.

A native of Towson, Maryland, Watkins was selected to play in the East–West All-Star Game in 1945 and 1946. He also played with Jackie Robinson's All-Stars in 1949. Small of stature but fleet of foot, he often batted leadoff. The Society for American Baseball Research described Watkins as a baseball lifer; after his career in the Negro Leagues, he played professionally in the Canadian League from 1951-1953, and continued to play semiprofessional baseball in Baltimore until he was in his 50s. Watkins died in Bolton Hill, Maryland, in 1987 at the age of 71.
