= Mandak League =

North Dakota/Manitoba baseball league (1950–1957)

The Manitoba-Dakota League was an independent baseball league based in Manitoba and North Dakota that was founded in 1950. It became the home for many African-American and Latino players. The league lasted through the 1957 season. It was known informally as the Mandak League or Man-Dak League. The league originated as the Manitoba Senior Baseball League founded in 1948, with Jimmy Dunn as its president.

It was the outlet for former Negro leaguers to continue playing and entertaining fans, occupying fields with ex-major leaguers, minor league stars and some of the best Manitoba, North Dakota, and Minnesota born players. It featured such greats as Willie Wells, Leon Day, Ray Dandridge and Satchel Paige, who pitched briefly for the Minot Mallards in 1950.

== History ==
=== Manitoba Senior Baseball League ===
The Manitoba Senior Baseball League was established in May 1948, which returned an independent baseball league to Manitoba for the first time since the Winnipeg Maroons of the Northern League folded in 1942. Winnipeg sports executive Jimmy Dunn was elected president of the league which included three teams in Winnipeg, and one team in Brandon, Manitoba. The league unsuccessfully sought to add a team based in Grand Forks, North Dakota. Dunn was re-elected president in 1949, and continued negotiations for a team in Grand Forks in addition to the four returning teams. When negotiations failed, an entry from Carman, Manitoba, was admitted as the fifth team in the league.

=== Foundation of the Mandak League ===
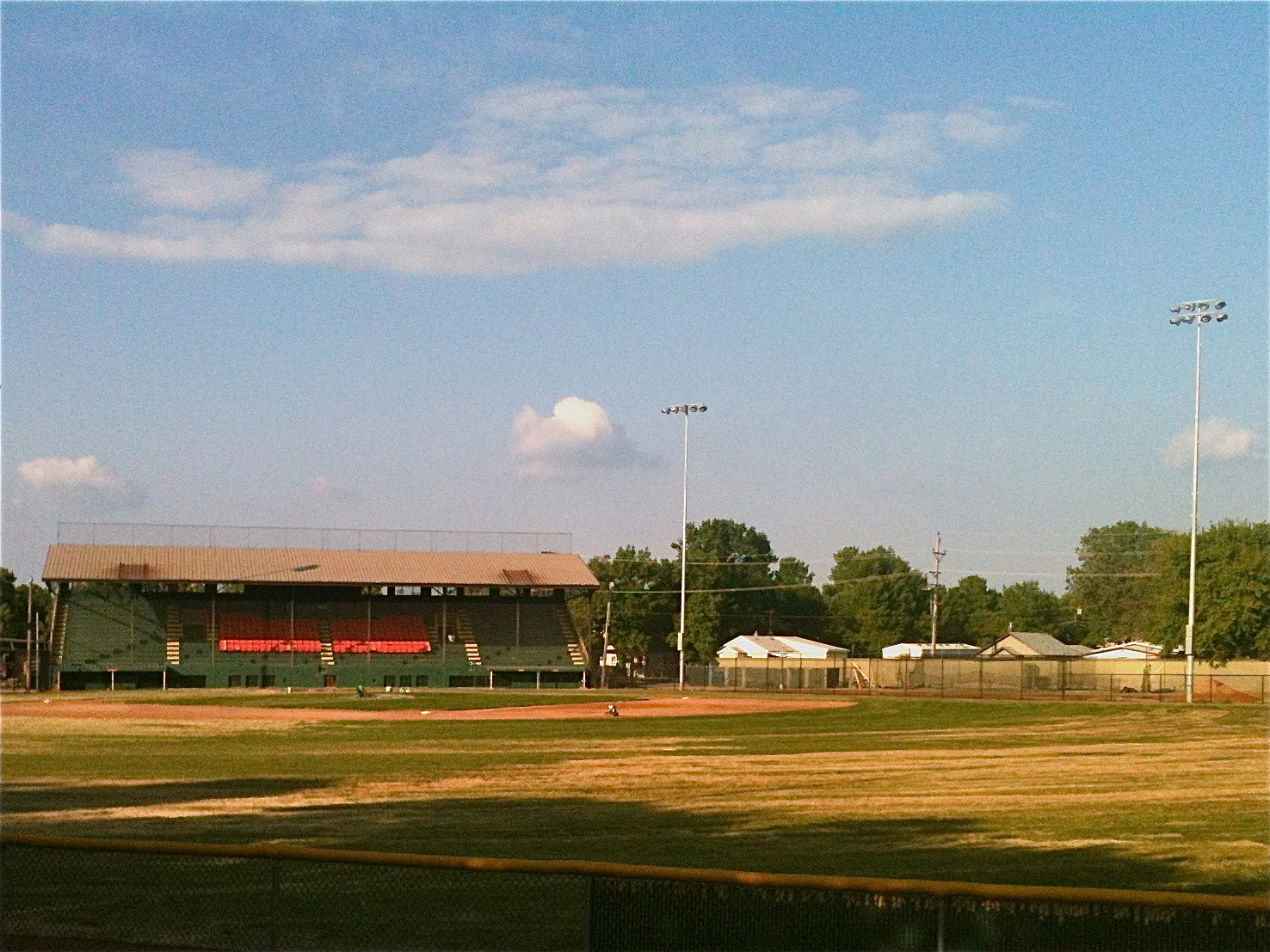
Corbett Field was the home stadium of the Minot Mallards.

In January 1950, the Manitoba Senior Baseball League added a team from Minot, North Dakota, and was reorganized into the Mandak League with Dunn elected as president for the season. The league drafted a new constitution, decided that its teams would wear a patch including both the flags of Canada and the United States, and planned a parade with a marching band through downtown Winnipeg on its opening day. Dunn described the opening day plans by saying that, "the Mandak baseball league this year will be more colourful than a Scotman's kilt".

Opening day was postponed due to the 1950 Red River flood inundating Osborne Stadium, and the schedule was changed for the Winnipeg teams begin on the road. Dunn and the league arranged several benefit games to raise money for local charities. Dunn planned a league all-star game in mid-June as a fundraiser for Winnipeg's Flood Fund, with the players picked by the Winnipeg Free Press and The Winnipeg Tribune.

In July 1950, Dunn stated that the Mandak League planned to speak with Major League Baseball commissioner Happy Chandler about joining the professional baseball structure for the following season. The Winnipeg Free Press expressed concerns that the Korean War could negatively affect the league, but also that the popularity of the Mandak League had led to decreased attendance for women's softball in Manitoba.

After the season, team executives lauded Dunn for his leadership of the league despite that only one of the five teams made a profit. He was unanimously re-elected as president and the league assumed the control of scheduling umpires instead of the home teams doing so. The league's schedule was increased from 48 to 64 games with the hope that more games would make the season profitable. Dunn resigned as Mandak League president at the conclusion of the 1951 season.

== List of teams ==
List of Mandak League teams:

- Bismarck Barons (1955–1957)
- Brandon Greys (1950–1954; 1957)
- Carman Cardinals (1950–1954)
- Dickinson Packers (1955–1956)
- Elmwood Giants (1950–1951)
- Minot Mallards (1950–1957)
- Williston Oilers (1954–1957)
- Winnipeg Buffaloes (1950–1951)
- Winnipeg Giants (1952)
- Winnipeg Royals (1953)

== Notable players ==
# American Baseball Hall of Fame and Museum member
* Major League player (including the Negro Major Leagues)

=== Bismarck Barons ===
- Al Cihocki *
- Ray Dandridge #
- Gary Gearhart *
- Preston Gómez *
- Ken Heintzelman *
- Walter McCoy *
- Fred Vaughn *
- Roy Weatherly *

=== Brandon Greys ===
- Bill Cash *
- Irvin Castille
- Leon Day #
- Howard Easterling *
- Garland Lawing *
- Al Lyons *
- Enrique Maroto
- Dee Moore *
- Charlie Peete *
- Lou Tost *
- Willie Wells #
- Dewey Williams *

=== Carman Cardinals ===
- Ed Albosta *
- Lyman Bostock Sr. *
- Chet Brewer *
- Sammy Drake *
- Lester Lockett *
- Walter McCoy *
- Andrew Porter *

=== Dickinson Packers ===
- Jerry Fahr *
- Rocky Krsnich *
- Garland Lawing *

=== Elmwood Giants ===
- Solly Drake *

=== Minot Mallards ===
- Ed Albosta *
- John André *
- Willard Brown #
- Vallie Eaves *
- Jimmy Grant *
- Otto Huber *
- Bill LeFebvre *
- Lou Lombardo *
- Joe Mack *
- Walter McCoy *
- Bill Oster *
- Satchel Paige #
- Mickey Rocco *
- Hal Schacker *
- Pete Taylor *
- Bill Upton *
- Bob Whitcher *
- Dewey Williams *

=== Williston Oilers ===
- Jerry Adair *
- Gary Gearhart *
- Al Gettel *
- Phil Haugstad *
- Bobby Hogue *
- Don Lee *
- Joe Lutz *
- Al Lyons *
- Dee Moore *
- Bert Shepard *
- Fred Vaughn *
- Roy Weatherly *
- Dewey Williams *

=== Winnipeg Buffaloes ===
- Lyman Bostock Sr. *
- Leon Day #
- Andrew Porter *
- Joe Taylor *
- Willie Wells #
- Charlie White *

=== Winnipeg Giants ===
- Lester Lockett *
- Walter McCoy *

=== Winnipeg Royals ===
- Dee Moore *
- Mickey Rocco *
