= Hank Miller =

American baseball player

- Pitcher
- Born: July 17, 1917; Glenolden, Pennsylvania, U.S.
- Died: August 30, 1972 (aged 55); Philadelphia, Pennsylvania, U.S.
- Batted: Right Threw: Right

Negro league baseball debut
- 1938, for the Newark Eagles

Last appearance
- 1948, for the Philadelphia Stars

Teams
- Newark Eagles (1938); Philadelphia Stars (1938–1948)

Henry Joseph Miller (July 17, 1917 – August 30, 1972) was an American Negro league pitcher for the Newark Eagles and Philadelphia Stars between 1938 and 1948.

A native of Glenolden, Pennsylvania, Miller spent the majority of his Negro league career with Philadelphia. He was selected to play in the 1947 East–West All-Star Game, and hurled two shutout innings. In 1951, he played minor league baseball for the San Diego Padres of the Pacific Coast League.

Miller was part of the Unión Laguna de Torreón team that won the Mexican League championship in 1950. He appeared in 29 games, posting a 8–11 record, and a 0.71 ERA with 141 strikeouts across 190 innings pitched.

Miller died in Philadelphia, Pennsylvania in 1972 at age 55.
