= Slim Jones =

American baseball player (1913–1938)

- Pitcher / First baseman
- Born: May 6, 1913; Baltimore, Maryland, U.S.
- Died: November 19, 1938 (aged 25); Baltimore, Maryland, U.S.
- Batted: Left Threw: Left

Negro leagues debut
- 1932, for the Baltimore Black Sox

Last Negro leagues appearance
- 1938, for the Philadelphia Stars

Negro leagues statistics
- Win–loss record: 32–21
- Earned run average: 3.24
- Strikeouts: 295
- Stats at Baseball Reference

Teams
- Baltimore Black Sox (1932–1933); Philadelphia Stars (1934–1938)

Career highlights and awards
- Negro National League pennant (1934); Triple Crown (1934); Negro National League ERA leader (1934); Negro National League wins leader (1934); Negro National League strikeout leader (1934)

Stuart "Slim" Jones (May 6, 1913 – November 19, 1938) was an American professional baseball pitcher and first baseman in negro league baseball. A native of Baltimore, Maryland, he played for the Baltimore Black Sox and the Philadelphia Stars of the East-West League and Negro National League II from 1932 to 1938.

In 1934, the 6' 6" Jones led the Negro National League II in earned run average (ERA) at 1.29, wins (20), and strikeouts (164) to become the first pitcher in Negro league history to achieve the pitching Triple Crown. This achievement was matched just three more times in league history. He set the pitching wins above replacement (WAR) record for a single season by a Negro League pitcher with 8.4, surpassing Bill Foster’s mark of 8.3 established in 1926. Jones was the winning pitcher in the final game of the Championship Series that clinched a pennant for the Stars. Jones was not in the league for a long time but was very effective during his short career.

Jones was plagued by trouble with alcoholism. He won just seven games in the four seasons he played after 1934. He died in Baltimore, Maryland, on November 19, 1938. According to legend, he froze to death after selling his coat for alcohol, but in reality he died after being admitted to a Baltimore hospital.

Fourteen years after his death, Jones received votes listing him on the 1952 Pittsburgh Courier player-voted poll of the Negro leagues' best players ever.
