= Chris Roycroft =

American baseball player (born 1997)

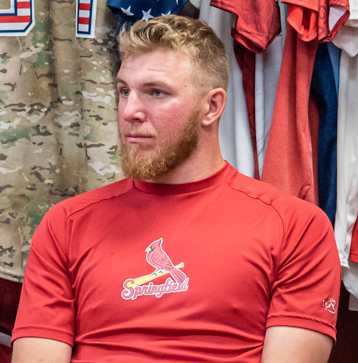
- Roycroft with the Springfield Cardinals at Hammons Field in 2023

Athletics – No. 56
- Pitcher
- Born: June 21, 1997 (age 29); Elmhurst, Illinois, U.S.
- Bats: Right Throws: Right

MLB debut
- May 7, 2024, for the St. Louis Cardinals

MLB statistics (through 2026 season)
- Win–loss record: 4–5
- Earned run average: 5.98
- Strikeouts: 77
- Stats at Baseball Reference

Teams
- St. Louis Cardinals (2024–2026); Tampa Bay Rays (2026); Athletics (2026–present)

Chris Michael Roycroft (born June 21, 1997) is an American professional baseball pitcher for the Athletics of Major League Baseball (MLB). He has previously played in Major League Baseball (MLB) for the St. Louis Cardinals and Tampa Bay Rays.

== Career ==
Roycroft attended Willowbrook High School in Villa Park, Illinois, graduating in 2015. He was named an All Area baseball player by the Daily Herald. He then attended Aurora University, where he played NCAA Division III college baseball and college basketball. After being a reliever his first three seasons, picking up 9 saves, he converted to a starting pitcher in 2019, going 7–3 with a 2.95 ERA in 11 starts. He was not drafted in 2019.

From 2017–2019, Roycroft played collegiate summer baseball in the Northwoods League, playing the 2017 and 2018 seasons with the Bismarck Larks and the 2019 season with the Green Bay Booyah.

=== Joliet Slammers ===
On February 9, 2021, Roycroft signed his first professional contract with the Joliet Slammers of the Frontier League. He signed after attending a tryout where he threw a 97 mile per hour fastball. He made 26 appearances for Joliet in 2021, logging a 4–4 record and 5.81 ERA with 62 strikeouts across 69 2/3 innings pitched. Roycroft improved his performance the following season, recording a 1.08 ERA across 13 games for the Slammers in the first half of 2022.

=== St. Louis Cardinals ===
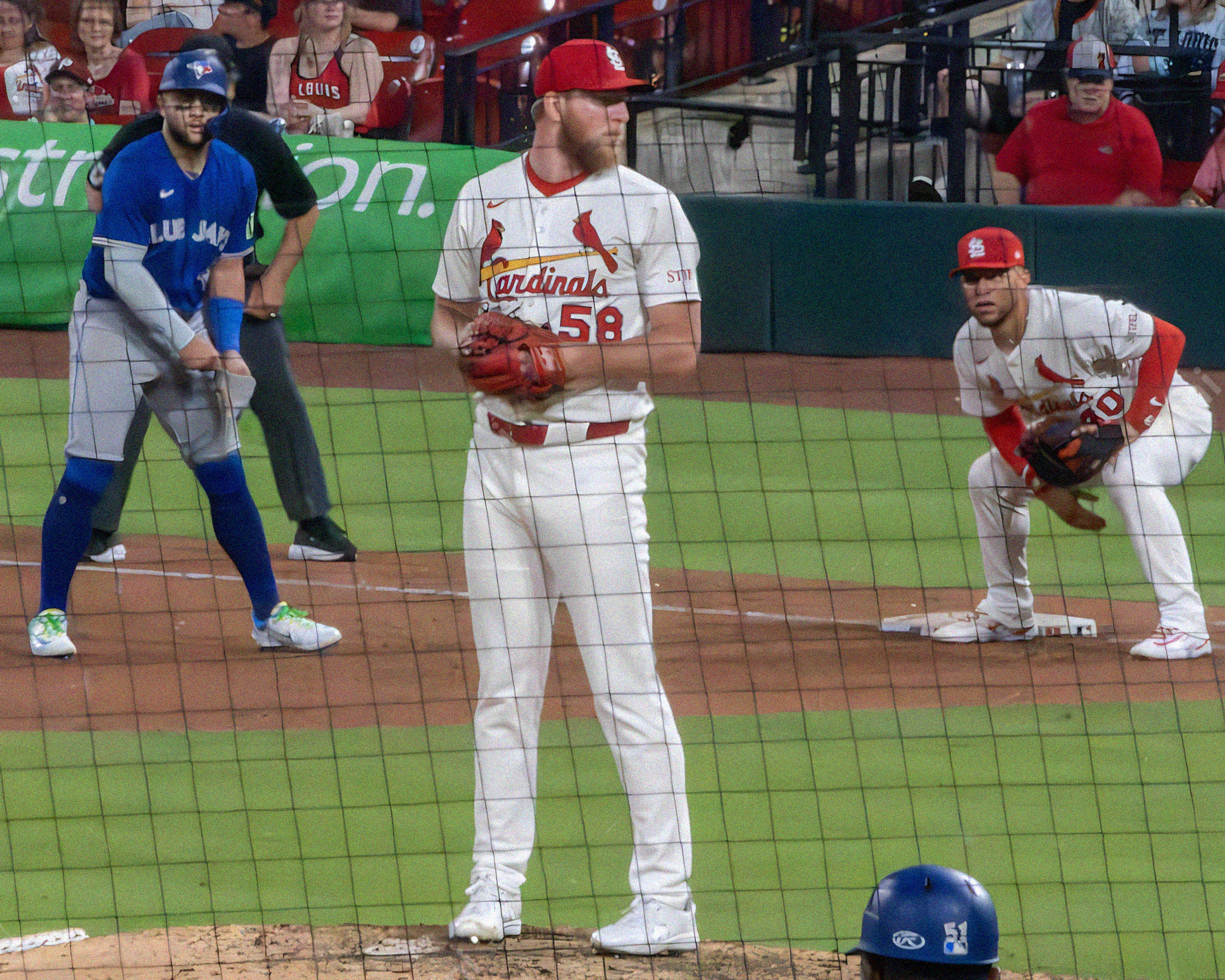
Roycroft on the mound against Toronto, 2025.

On June 29, 2022, Roycroft signed a minor league contract with the St. Louis Cardinals. He finished the year with the High-A Peoria Chiefs, with a 4.50 ERA with 40 strikeouts in 32 innings across 19 appearances.

Roycroft began the 2023 season Peoria and was promoted twice, moving up to the Double-A Springfield Cardinals in early May and the Triple-A Memphis Redbirds early July. In 46 games as a reliever for the three affiliates, he had a 7–8 record and 5.86 ERA with 64 strikeouts across 63 innings. Roycroft began the 2024 season with Memphis.

On May 6, 2024, Roycroft was added to the 40-man roster and promoted to the major leagues for the first time. He made his MLB debut the following night, striking out two batters but allowing a line drive home run to Pete Alonso. Roycroft won his first MLB game on June 13, getting the final two outs in the sixth inning against the Pittsburgh Pirates. He finished his rookie season with a 1–2 record, 4.19 ERA and 33 strikeouts in 34 1/3 innings.

In 2025, Roycraft made 20 relief appearances for the Cardinals and had a 1-3 record, a 7.84 ERA and 15 strikeouts over 20 2/3 innings. He also pitched with Memphis and went 3-2 with a 4.82 ERA over 46 2/3 innings.

Roycraft made seven appearances for the Cardinals in 2026, but struggled to a 15.19 ERA with four strikeouts across 5 1/3 innings. On June 18, 2026, Roycroft was designated for assignment by the Cardinals following the promotion of Max Rajcic.

=== Tampa Bay Rays ===
On June 23, 2026, the Cardinals traded Roycroft to the Tampa Bay Rays in exchange for a player to be named later. He made 11 appearances for Tampa Bay, logging a 1–0 record and 6.52 ERA with 14 strikeouts and one save across 19 1/3 innings pitched. Roycroft was designated for assignment by the Rays on August 23.

=== Athletics ===
On August 25, 2026, Roycroft was claimed off of waivers by the Athletics.

== Personal life ==
Roycroft's parents are Margaret and Don. He has a brother, Corey, and sisters Jazmine and Makense.
