= Stanley Glenn =

Stan Glenn
- Catcher
- Born: September 19, 1926; Wachapreague, Virginia, U.S.
- Died: April 16, 2011 (aged 84); Yeadon, Pennsylvania, U.S.
- Batted: Right Threw: Right

Negro leagues debut
- 1944, for the Philadelphia Stars

Last appearance
- 1953, for the Lincoln Chiefs
- Stats at Baseball Reference

Stanley "Doc" Glenn (September 19, 1926 – April 16, 2011) was an American professional baseball catcher with the Philadelphia Stars of the Negro leagues from 1944 to 1950. He also played three years in the minors and two in the Canadian senior Intercounty Baseball League in southwestern Ontario for the St. Thomas Elgins in the early 1950s.

After his retirement from baseball, Glenn spent 40 years in the wholesale electric supply business. In 2006, Glenn released his first published book entitled, Don't Let Anyone Take Your Joy Away: An inside look at Negro League baseball and its legacy.

Glenn was born in Wachapreague, Virginia, and was signed by hall-of-famer Oscar Charleston out of John Bartram High School in Philadelphia, Pennsylvania.

== Honors ==
In February 1994, Stanley Glenn and several other players from the Negro leagues were honored by Vice-President Al Gore at the White House. "See pictures of the event here". Archived from the original on May 6, 2006.

In 2004, Glenn was inducted into the Eastern Shore Baseball Hall of Fame in Maryland.

== NLBPA President and Advocacy ==
Stanley (Doc) Glenn retired in Philadelphia and was active as president of the Negro Leagues Baseball Players Association's Board of Directors.

Glenn died on April 16, 2011, in Yeadon, Pennsylvania. He is interred at Ferwood Cemetery in Lansdowne, Pennsylvania.
