= Walter McCoy (baseball) =

American baseball player

- Pitcher
- Born: February 20, 1920; Leavenworth, Kansas, U.S.
- Died: November 10, 2015 (aged 95); San Diego, California, U.S.
- Batted: Right Threw: Right

Walter Loreo McCoy (February 20, 1920 – November 10, 2015) was an American Negro league baseball and Minor League Baseball pitcher. Listed at 5 ft 11 in (1.80 m), 172 pounds (78 kg), he batted and threw right handed.

Born in Leavenworth, Kansas, McCoy grew up in San Diego, California where he was a sandlot ball star before pitching in the Negro leagues in the mid-1940s. In between, he entered military service in 1942 and earned an MVP Award while pitching on the U.S. Army special services team.

Following his discharge in 1945, McCoy played for the Chicago American Giants and Kansas City Monarchs of the Negro leagues in a four-season span from 1945 to 1948. He had decent success before moving to organized baseball in 1949, playing in various Minor League clubs and also in the Mexican League before retiring from baseball in 1955.

McCoy spent 1949 with the Visalia Cubs of the California League. Then, in 1950, he became the first black ballplayer to appear in a game for the Sacramento Solons in the AAA Pacific Coast League.

Afterwards, McCoy played for the Potros de Tijuana of the Southwest International League from 1951 to 1952. He then found himself on the move again, expanding his career in the independent Manitoba-Dakota League with the Winnipeg Giants, Bismarck Barons and Carman Cardinals in all or part of three seasons spanning 1953–1955, ending his playing days with the Tecolotes de Nuevo Laredo of the Mexican League late in 1955.

In an eight-year career, McCoy posted an 8–13 record and a 5.27 earned run average in 28 games (14 starts). He also played winter ball with the Yaquis de Obregón of the Mexican Pacific League in its 1947–1948 season, setting a league pitching record by winning 11 consecutive games. In the same season, he allowed just one hit in a 2–0 shutout over the Venados de Mazatlán on January 8, 1948.

After retiring, McCoy worked as a building contractor for more than 40 years. In his spare time, he coached his grandson's Little League Baseball team, while his daughter served as an assistant coach. From 1996 to 1997, McCoy played on a 30-year and older baseball team with his sons and was chosen for the All-Star team. He continued coaching his grandson through 1999.

McCoy gained huge recognition when Major League Baseball held a special draft of the surviving Negro league players before the 2008 MLB draft. Each Major League club selected a surviving former Negro leagues player, who represented every player who did not have the opportunity to play baseball in the major leagues. The idea of the special draft was conceived by Hall of Famer Dave Winfield, well known for his exceptional community service through the years. As a result, McCoy was drafted as a pitcher by the San Diego Padres.

McCoy died from natural causes November 10, 2015, in Lemon Grove, California, at the age of 95. He was interred at Mount Hope Cemetery in San Diego.
