= Bismarck Larks =

American baseball team

- Logo

Information
- League: Northwoods League (Great Plains West [2019–present]) (North Division [2017–2018])
- Location: Bismarck, North Dakota
- Ballpark: Bismarck Municipal Ballpark
- Founded: 2017
- Colors: Black, gold, heather gray, white, light gray, tan, brown
- Ownership: John Bollinger, Glenn Bosch & Terry Daffinrud
- Management: John Bollinger
- Manager: Mark Weidemaier
- Website: larksbaseball.com

The Bismarck Larks are a collegiate summer baseball team that plays in the Northwoods League. Based in Bismarck, North Dakota, the Larks play their home games at Bismarck Municipal Ballpark.

== History ==
On August 28, 2015, it was announced that the Northwoods League had agreed to terms for a team to begin play in Bismarck for 2017. In June 2016, the team launched a name-the-team contest, and the three finalists were Larks, Bullies and Flickertails. The Bismarck Larks name, logo and colors were officially unveiled in October.

On May 30, 2017, the Larks played their first ever game, which was a home game at Bismarck Municipal Ballpark. Facing the Eau Claire Express, the Larks secured a 2-1 walk-off victory. Their final game of their inaugural season was against the La Crosse Loggers on August 13, and Larks won in walk-fashion again, 1-0.

In 2018, the Larks finished with a 37-34 with a lineup featuring future MLB players Jeff Lindgren and Chris Roycroft. The team qualified for the playoffs, but fell to the Duluth Huskies in the North divisional quarterfinal.

In 2020, the Northwoods League temporarily altered their structure due to the Covid-19 pandemic, operating with seven hyper-regional pod divisions. Bismarck was one of the four teams (along with Kenosha, Traverse City, and Kalamazoo) that created temporary teams and operated out of one facility. The Larks competed in the North Dakota Division alongside the Bismarck Bull Moose and Mandan Flickertails. The Larks won the North Dakota Pod Championship. After the season, the Bull Moose and Flickertails were discontinued.

== Rivalry ==
The Larks compete for the Railroad to Roosevelt Trophy with the Badlands Big Sticks. The rivalry began in 2024 when the Big Sticks entered the Northwoods League.

== Larks in MLB ==
The following is a list of former Bismark Larks to have appeared in Major League Baseball.

Name	MLB teams played for	Years with Larks	MLB Debut
Jeff Lindgren	Miami Marlins	2017–2018	April 3, 2023
Chris Roycroft	St. Louis Cardinals, Tampa Bay Rays, Athletics	2017–2018	May 7, 2024

== Year-by-Year Records ==
Season	Manager	Overall Record	Split Season Records	Playoffs
2017	Sean Repay	31–40 (.437)	First Half: 16–19 (.457) Second Half: 15–21 (.417)	Did not make playoffs
2018^{*}	Sean Repay	37–34 (.521)	First Half: 25–11 (.694)* Second Half: 12–23 (.347)	Lost 5–13 to Duluth
2019	Sean Repay	32–40 (.444)	First Half: 20–16 (.556) Second Half: 12–24 (.333)	Did not make playoffs
2020 ^{#}	Will Flynt	33–15 (.688)	COVID-19 Season	Lost 0–2 to Mandan Defeated Mandan 9–2 Defeated Mandan 5–0 Northwoods League ND Pod Champs^{#}
2021	Will Flynt	30–38 (.441)	First Half: 18–17 (.514) Second Half: 12–21 (.364)	Did not make playoffs
2022	Will Flynt	23–45 (.338)	First Half: 11–23 (.324) Second Half: 12–22 (.353)	Did not make playoffs
2023	Will Flynt	26–41 (.388)	First Half: 16–18 (.471) Second Half: 10–23 (.303)	Did not make playoffs
2024	Mark Weidemaier	34–36 (.486)	First Half: 18–18 (.500) Second Half: 16–18 (.471)	Did not make playoffs
2025	Mark Weidemaier	18–54 (.250)	First Half: 11–25 (.306) Second Half: 7–29 (.194)	Did not make Playoffs
2026	Chris Monroe	34–35 (.493)	First Half: 16–18 (.471) Second Half: 18–17 (.514)	Did not make Playoffs

* Denotes Best 1st Half Record in North Division
