= Philadelphia Stars (baseball) =

Negro league baseball team from Philadelphia

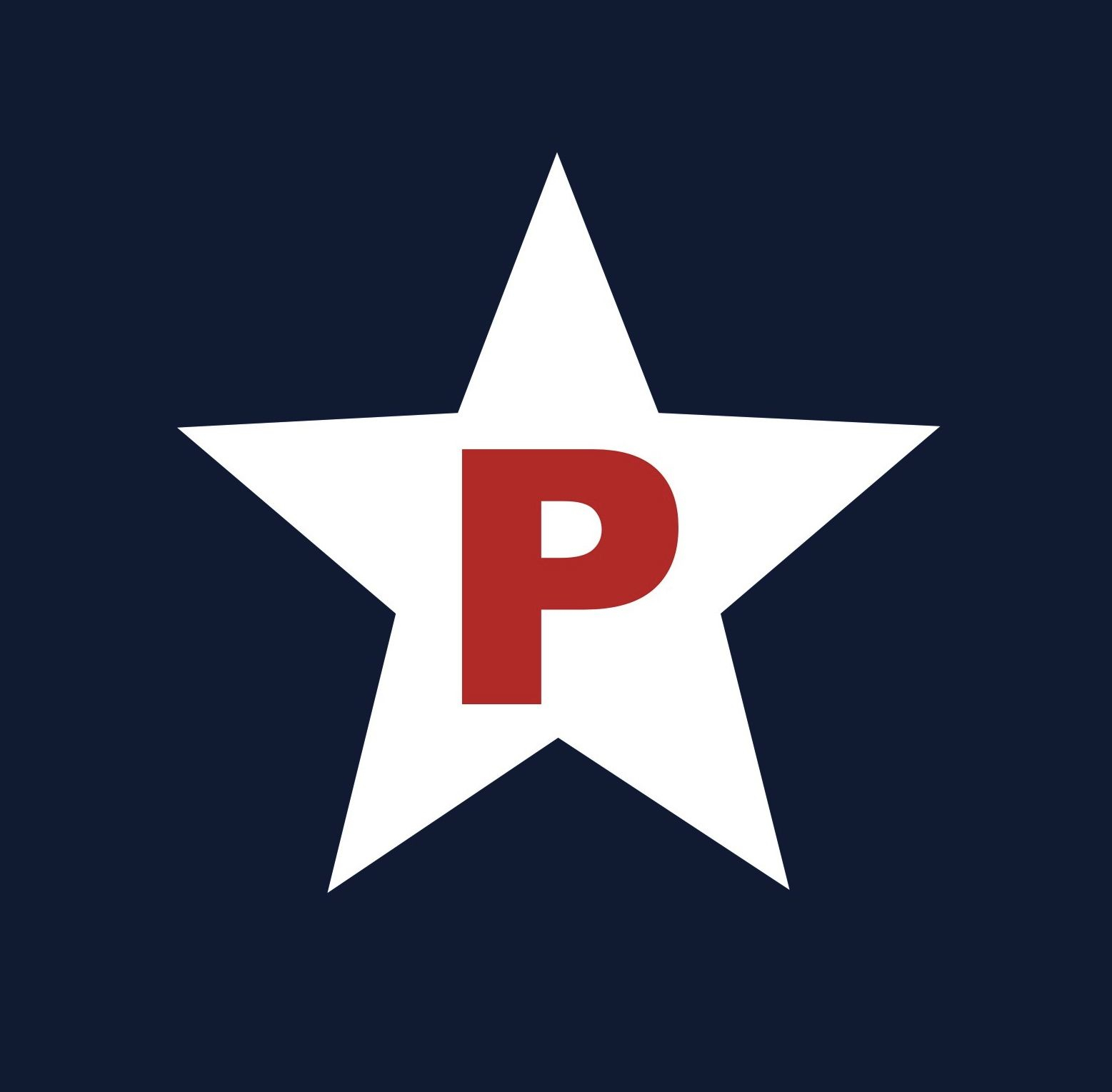
Logo
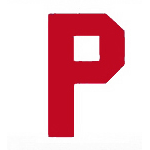
Cap insignia

Information
- League: Independent (1933); Negro National League (1934–1948); Negro American League (1949–1952)
- Location: Philadelphia, Pennsylvania
- Ballpark: Passon Field (1934–1935); 44th and Parkside Ballpark (1936–1952); Shibe Park (1943)
- Established: 1933
- Disbanded: 1952
- League titles: 1934

The Philadelphia Stars were a Negro league baseball team from Philadelphia. The Stars were founded in 1933 when Ed Bolden returned to professional black baseball after being idle since early 1930. The Stars were an independent ball club in 1933, a member of the Negro National League from 1934 until the League's collapse following the 1948 season, and affiliated with the Negro American League from 1949 to 1952.

In 1934, led by 20-year-old left-hander Slim Jones, the Stars defeated the Chicago American Giants in a controversial playoff series, four games to three, for the Negro National League pennant. At their high point in mid-1930s, the team starred such greats as Biz Mackey, Jud Wilson, and Dick Lundy. Following his release by Cleveland, Satchel Paige signed with the Stars in July 1950, before returning to the Majors with Bill Veeck and the St. Louis Browns.

The club disbanded after the 1952 season.

== History ==
The Stars were founded and organized by Ed Bolden. Bolden had owned the Hilldale Club that won the Eastern Colored League pennant in 1923, 1924, and 1925, and which beat the Kansas City Monarchs in the Negro League World Series in 1925. Bolden was also a founder of the ECL. Bolden was instrumental in building the Stars' 1934 championship club and ran the team until his death in 1950.

After Bolden's death, his ownership passed to his daughter, Hilda Bolden Shorter. Shorter ran the club through 1952.

The team was financed, and owned in part by sports promoter Eddie Gottlieb who also owned the Philadelphia Sphas and Philadelphia Warriors basketball teams. Gottlieb leased Penmar Park from the Pennsylvania Railroad for use by the Stars. In addition to the Stars, Gottlieb was the booking agent for all the Negro league teams in the Northeast, taking 10-percent of gate receipts for his work.

=== 1933: Independent ===
Ed Bolden organized the Philadelphia Stars who played their first season in 1933. The Negro National League was composed primarily of mid-western teams in 1933 and many east-coast clubs were independent. The Stars were originally one such unaffiliated club and primarily played against local white semi-professional and professional teams. For example, by June 1933, the Stars' only games against black teams had been against the Philadelphia Bacharach Giants and the Pittsburgh Crawfords.

=== 1934–1948: Negro National League ===
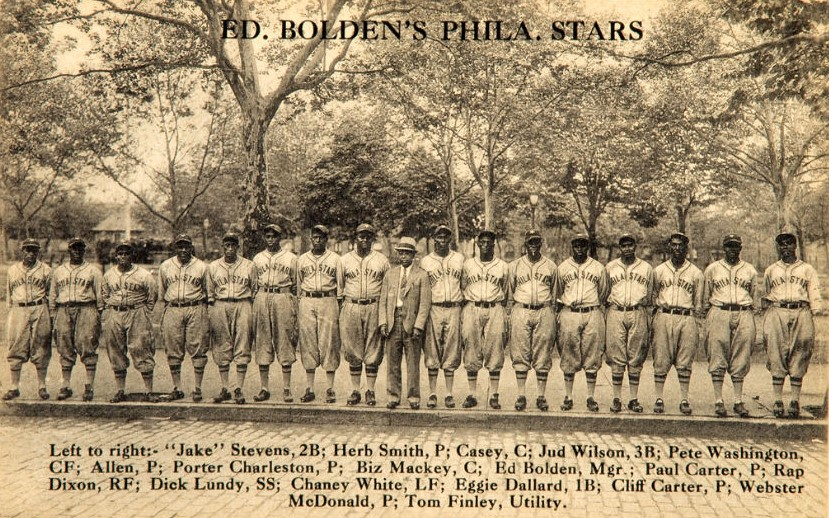
1933 Philadelphia Stars postcard

The Negro National League used a split-season playoff system in 1934 with the season's first-half winner playing the second-half winner for the championship. The Chicago American Giants won the first-half. The Stars won the second-half with a record of 11–4.

The Stars won the 1934 Negro National League Championship by beating the Chicago American Giants 4-3-1 in a best of seven-game series. The championship series, however, was beset by problems.

The first four games of the best-of-seven series were played in Chicago. The games went smoothly and Chicago won three of four. But game 5 was delayed by 10 days for unexplained reasons. When the Series resumed in Philadelphia, the Stars won game 6 to tie the series but did so amidst controversy.

Early in game 6, Stars’ third-baseman Jud Wilson seemed to hit umpire Bert Gholston which should have meant immediate ejection. Over the protest of Chicago manager Dave Malarcher, Gholston refused to eject Wilson. Later in the game, Stars catcher Ameal Brooks pushed another of the umpires who also refused to eject the Stars player.

Prior to game 7, Malarcher filed a protest with NNL Commissioner Rollo Wilson over Jud Wilson's actions. The Commissioner met with the team owners and umpires. Gholston claimed he had wanted to eject Wilson but was threatened by Stars players and intimidated into allowing Wilson to play. Stars owner Bolden threatened not to play game 7 if Jud Wilson was suspended and the Commissioner buckled under the pressure.

The teams played game 7 on October 1 at Passon Field. The game ended in a 4–4 tie due to darkness. Game 8 was played the following day and Slim Jones pitched the Stars to a 2–0 victory and the championship.

Both the Stars and Giants filed protests over games 7 and 8. Giants player Turkey Stearnes hit an umpire and controversy hung over the series. The Stars claimed the Giants had used ineligible players. The Giants protested that two games should not have been played at night. Nevertheless, the Stars championship was upheld by the league.

The Stars finished in fourth place in 1945 and 1946, fifth in 1947, and finished in fourth place again in 1948 with a 27–29 record.

=== 1949–1952: Negro American League ===
After integration and the collapse of the Negro National League, the Stars popularity and impact declined dramatically before folding at the end of 1952 season.

== Home ballparks ==
The team played at Passon Field during the 1934 and 1935 seasons. Passon Field was located at the current site of West Philadelphia High School's athletic field (baseball and football) now called Pollock Field and was the former home of the Philadelphia Bacharach Giants.

In 1936, the Stars moved to 44th and Parkside Ballpark where they played the majority of their home games through 1947 when they lost their lease.

The Stars often played on Monday nights at Shibe Park which had a higher seating capacity and which was located in North Philadelphia. 24,165 fans saw the Stars defeat Satchel Paige and the Kansas City Monarchs on June 21, 1943.

After 1947, the Stars played home games at area ballparks including Wilmington Park in Delaware, home of the Wilmington Blue Rocks minor-league team.

== Logos and Uniforms ==
The Stars did not have an official team logo as professional and collegiate teams have today. It was not common practice for teams to have such standardized team symbols in the 1930s and 1940s. The Stars wore uniforms with red and navy blue decoration. The cap most commonly associated today with the Stars is their 1938 cap, which has a navy crown, red brim, and white star with a red sans-serif P. For most of their history, they wore a white cap with a red brim and red sans-serif P. Another style cap worn by the Stars was an all navy cap with a red P.

The Negro Leagues Baseball Museum (NLBM) created a series of team logos in the 1990s for the well-known Negro league teams so that the NLBM could license such logos and collect royalties for their use on merchandise. Such revenue helps sustain the museum. The Stars were one such team for which a contemporary logo was created. It is seen on NLBM-licensed Stars merchandise and while it supports the educational efforts of the Museum, it is not a historical logo.

== Notable players ==
=== All-Star Team Selections ===
The Negro League Baseball All-Star Game was called the East-West Game. Players were not divided by league, but by geographical location; Stars players played for the East. Players were voted to the teams by the fans with votes tallied by the Chicago Defender and the Pittsburgh Courier newspapers. These Philadelphia Stars appeared in the All-Star game for the East team.
Only players from the Pittsburgh Crawfords and Washington Elite Giants played for the East in the 1936 game.
Two games were played in 1939, 1942, and 1946–1948.

- 1933 – Rap Dixon (RF), Dick Lundy (SS), Biz Mackey (C), Jud Wilson (3B)
- 1934 – Slim Jones (P), Jud Wilson (3B)
- 1935 – Slim Jones (P), Biz Mackey (C), Webster McDonald (MGR), Dick Seay (2B), Jake Stephens (SS), Jud Wilson (3B)
- 1936 – no Stars on team
- 1937 – Jake Dunn (2B)
- 1938 – Jake Dunn (PH)
- 1939 – Red Parnell (LF), Andy Patterson (3B)
- 1940 – Gene Benson (CF), Henry McHenry (P)
- 1941 – Henry McHenry (P)
- 1942 – Barney Brown (P), Andy Patterson (3B), Jim West (1B)
- 1943 – no Stars on team
- 1944 – Barney Brown (did not appear in game), Marvin Williams (P)
- 1945 – Frank Austin (SS), Gene Benson (LF), Bill Ricks (P)
- 1946 – Frank Austin (PH), Gene Benson (RF), Barney Brown (P), Murray Watkins (PH)
- 1947 – Frank Austin (SS), Henry Miller (P)
- 1948 – Frank Austin (SS), Bill Cash (C)
- 1949 – Bill Cash (C), Oscar Charleston (MGR), Buster Clarkson (RF), Bob Griffith (P)
- 1950 – Jonas Gaines (P), Ben Littles (RF), Charles White (3B)
- 1951 – Wilmer Harris (P), Ben Littles (PH), Milt Smith (3B)
- 1952 – Wilmer Harris (P), Jimmy Jones (RF), Ted Washington (SS), Don Whittingdon (3B)

=== Negro National League Rookie of the Year ===
- 1940 Mahlon Duckett

=== Hall of Famers ===
No player has been enshrined in the Baseball Hall of Fame with a Stars cap and the following inductees were with the Philadelphia Stars in their career.

Philadelphia Stars Hall of Famers
Inductee	Position	Tenure	Inducted
Roy Campanella	OF	1944	1969
Oscar Charleston	CF; Manager	1941; 1942–1944; 1946–1950	1976
Biz Mackey	C	1933–1935	2006
Satchel Paige	P	1946, 1950	1971
Turkey Stearnes	OF	1936	2000
Jud Wilson	3B; Manager	1933–1939; 1937	2006

Stars co-owner Eddie Gottlieb was inducted into the Basketball Hall of Fame in 1972 for his pioneering work as a team owner, promoter, and league official.

== Contemporary legacy ==
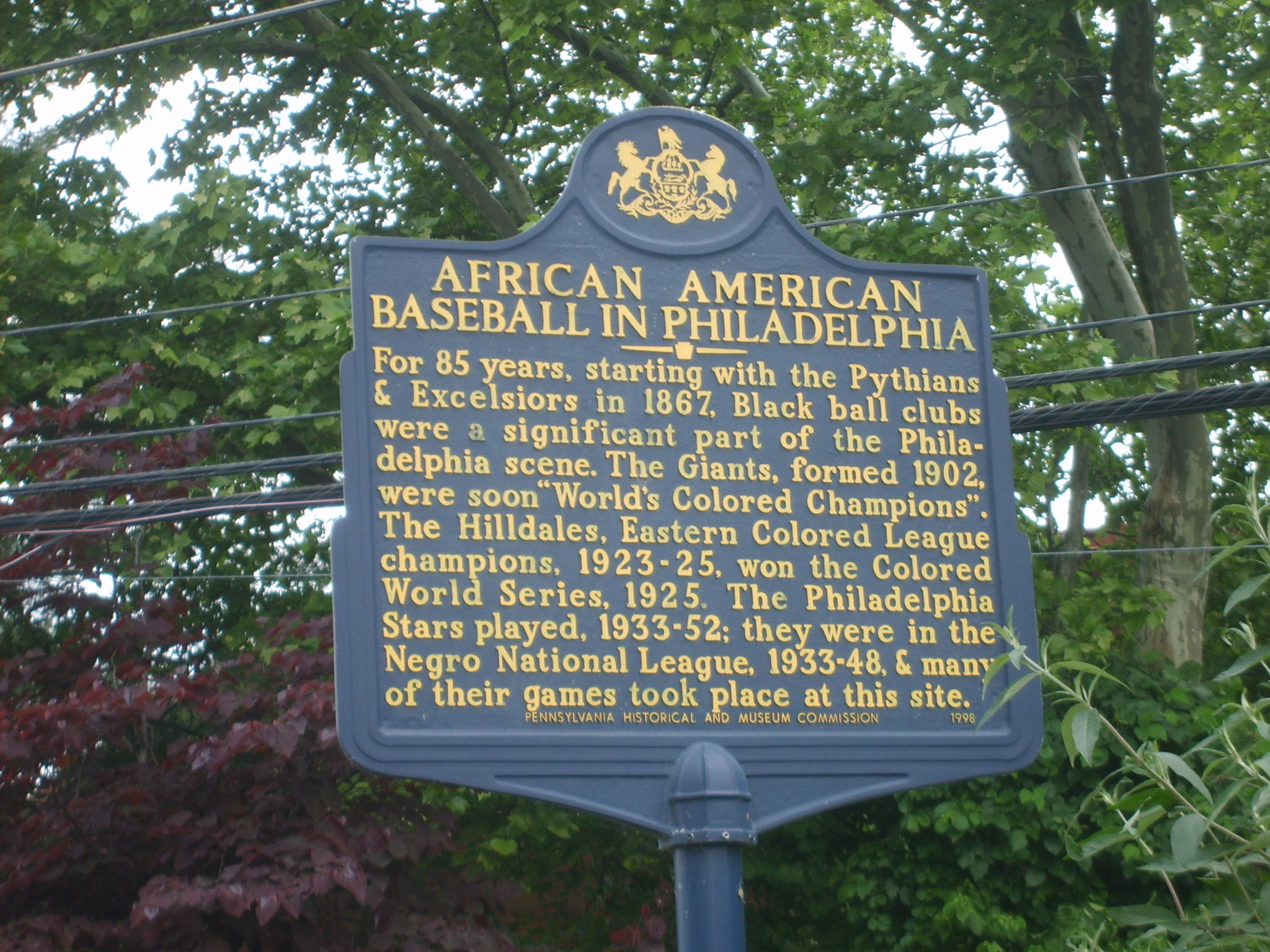
"African American Baseball in Philadelphia", Pennsylvania Historical and Museum Commission, (1998) at Belmont and Parkside Avenues, Philadelphia, PA 19131.

- On June 28, 1997, the Philadelphia Phillies played the Atlanta Braves at Turner Field in Atlanta. In honor of the 50th anniversary of Jackie Robinson breaking professional baseball's color-line, the Braves wore 1938 Atlanta Black Crackers home uniforms and the Phillies wore 1938 Stars road uniforms. On May 14, 2011, the Phillies again wore Stars uniforms against the Braves in Atlanta.
- In 1998, Philadelphia's West Parkside community, established a historical marker at the southwest corner of Belmont and Parkside Avenues, site of the former Y.M.C.A. Athletic Field, which became home to the Philadelphia Stars and known as the 44th and Parkside Ballpark. The historical marker recognizes the history of African-American baseball there and in greater Philadelphia.
- Prior to its 2008 First-Year Player Draft, Major League Baseball held a ceremonial draft of surviving players from the Negro leagues to honor those players excluded from organized professional baseball. Every team in Major League Baseball selected a player whose career encompassed the Negro leagues. Former Stars players who participated in the draft were Walter Lee Gibbons, a pitcher who pitched briefly for the Stars in 1941 and was selected by the Tampa Bay Rays, pitcher Harold Gould selected by the Toronto Blue Jays, and infielder Mahlon Duckett who was selected by the Phillies.
- The African American Museum in Philadelphia maintains the "William Cash/Lloyd Thompson Collection" of Stars and Hilldale Club scorebooks, photographs, and correspondence.
