= Al Cihocki =

American baseball player (1924–2014)

- Second baseman/Shortstop
- Born: May 7, 1924; Nanticoke, Pennsylvania, U.S.
- Died: March 27, 2014 (aged 89); Nanticoke, Pennsylvania, U.S.
- Batted: Right Threw: Right

MLB debut
- April 17, 1945, for the Cleveland Indians

Last MLB appearance
- September 22, 1945, for the Cleveland Indians

MLB statistics
- Batting average: .212
- Hits: 60
- Runs batted in: 24
- Stats at Baseball Reference

Teams
- Cleveland Indians (1945)

Albert Joseph Cihocki (May 7, 1924 – March 27, 2014) was an American Major League Baseball infielder who played for one season. He played for the Cleveland Indians from April 17, 1945, to September 22, 1945.

Cihocki was born in Nanticoke, Pennsylvania, where he played sandlot ball with Steve Bilko, his cousin who also went on to play in the major leagues, as well as Pete Gray. He originally tried out for the Philadelphia Phillies organization in 1941 and Wilkes-Barre Barons in 1942 but failed to make the cut for either team. Cihocki then joined the Batavia Clippers as a third baseman, where he had a batting average of .342 and was named to the New York–Penn League's All-Star team.

After finishing the season, he joined the United States Coast Guard, and served for two years at the United States Coast Guard Yard in Curtis Bay, Baltimore. Early in 1945, he received a medical discharge from the Coast Guard, and resumed his professional baseball career with the Cleveland Indians organization. Due to a lack of players available as a result of the war, Cihocki made the major league squad and remained there throughout the season. In 92 career games, Cihocki had a .212 batting average. After one season with the Indians, he joined the Baltimore Orioles, where he spent the next seven years. During his time with the Orioles, he played 850 total games, and was considered the team's "Iron Man". He also spent one year with the Sabios de Vargas of the Venezuelan Professional Baseball League, playing in 14 games for them.

The Orioles released Cihocki after the 1952 season, and he continued to play on and off until 1958, where he spent his final year in professional baseball with the Allentown Red Sox. After retiring from baseball, he coached various minor league teams and served as a corrections officer at the Dallas Correctional Institution. He died on March 27, 2014.
