= Sioux Falls Canaries (1902–1953) =

- 1902–1953; (1902–1903, 1920–1924, 1938–1942, 1946–1953, 1966–1971); Sioux Falls, South Dakota

Minor league affiliations
- Class: Class D (1902–1903, 1920–1924, 1938–1941); Class C (1942, 1946–1953); Class A (1966–1971)
- League: Iowa–South Dakota League (1902–1903); South Dakota League (1920–1923); Tri-State League (1924); Nebraska State League (1933–1938); Western League (1939–1941); Northern League (1942, 1946–1953, 1966–1971)

Major league affiliations
- Team: Chicago Cubs (1939, 1947–1953); Cincinnati Reds (1966–1971)

Minor league titles
- League titles (7): 1901*; 1902; 1923; 1924; 1937; 1940; 1947; 1950; 1964*
- Conference titles (2): 1935; 1936
- Division titles (1): 1940
- Wild card berths (4): 1939; 1940; 1942; 1952

Team data
- Name: Sioux Falls Canaries (1902–1903); Sioux Falls Soos (1920–1923); Sioux Falls Canaries (1924, 1933–1942, 1946–1953); Sioux Falls Packers (1966–1971)
- Ballpark: The Oval (1902–1903); Nelson Field (1920–1924, 1938–1940); Sioux Falls Stadium (1941–1942, 1946–1953, 1966–1971)

The Sioux Falls Canaries were a minor league baseball team based in Sioux Falls, South Dakota, United States, playing in six different leagues between 1902 and 1953.

In the era, the Sioux Falls Canaries played in Class D level leagues through 1941. Sioux Falls first played as members of the 1902 and 1903 Iowa–South Dakota League. After a period of time without a team, Sioux Falls resumed play in the South Dakota League from 1920 to 1923 and the short-lived Tri State League in 1924. The Canaries joined Nebraska State League in 1933 playing in the league through the 1938 season before competing in the Western League from 1939 to 1941. The Canaries then joined the Class C level Northern League in 1942 and resumed play in the league from 1946 to 1953 following World War II.

The Sioux Falls minor league team was known as the Soos while playing in the South Dakota League from 1920 to 1923. The Sioux Falls Packers played in the amateur collegiate Basin League in 1964 and 1965 before rejoining the professional Northern League in 1966. The Packers won the 1964 league championship. Sioux Falls resumed play in the reformed 1966 Class A level Northern League known as the Packers. The Packers ended their tenure when the Northern League folded following the 1971 season.

The Sioux Falls minor league teams won league championships in the 1902, 1923, 1924, 1937, 1940, 1947 and 1950 seasons, also capturing regular season pennants in 1935 and 1936.

The Sioux Falls Canaries played as a minor league affiliate of the Chicago Cubs in 1939 and from 1947 to 1953. Resuming Northern League play, the Sioux Falls Packers were a Cincinnati Reds affiliate from 1966 to 1971. Several members of the 1975 and 1976 World Series champion Cincinnati Reds teams played for Sioux Falls.

In their first seasons of play, the 1902 and 1903 Sioux Falls Canaries hosted minor home games at a ballpark called The Oval. Sioux City teams next played home games at Nelson Field from 1920 through 1940, before moving to Sioux Falls Stadium. The Sioux Falls Stadium site has hosted the minor league teams since the 1941 season, with numerous ballpark renovations. Today, Sioux Falls Stadium hosts the Sioux Falls Canaries of the American Association of Professional Baseball league. The modern Canaries were formed in 1993, playing at the ballpark as members of the Northern League.

At 19 years of age, Baseball Hall of Fame member Don Sutton pitched for the 1964 Packers in the Basin League while still a collegiate player. In 1941, Hall of famer Dizzy Dean pitched in one home game for the Canaries at the conclusion of his pitching career due to injury.

== History ==
=== Baseball beginnings in Sioux Falls ===
Early baseball town teams in Sioux Falls were playing in the 1880s. These early teams were nicknamed as the Hub City Nine and the Yellow Kids.

The first known professional baseball team was founded in Sioux Falls in 1889, with players receiving payment to play. The Sioux Falls baseball uniforms were bright yellow in color. Seeing the uniforms, Guy LaFollette, the sportswriter for the Sioux Fall Press, first suggested the nickname "Canaries" for the team based on their colors. LaFollette proceeded to refer to the team as the Canaries while covering the team for the newspaper. The local nickname from LaFollette caught on and remained the nickname for many future Sioux Falls professional teams to follow.

In the 1901 season, Sioux Falls hosted an independent semi-professional team. This team was again known as the Canaries. Sioux Falls began the season playing in a South Dakota league with teams from the South Dakota cities of Aberdeen, Flandreau, Madison and Mitchell. However, the league was informal and had no set schedule. On July 23, 1901, both the Mitchell and Madison teams were folded. Sioux Falls continued play and traveled to Minnesota and Iowa, playing the St. Paul Marquettes, a Waseca, Minnesota team and a Fort Dodge, Iowa team among others to finish their season. The Sioux Falls Canaries team ended their 1901 season with a 46-29 record and were the unofficial champions of the South Dakota League.

Third baseman George McBride and outfielder/pitcher George Disch played on the 1901 Canaries team. Disch batted .311 in 24 games and McBride hit .282 while playing in 21 games for Sioux Falls. After his tenure with Sioux Falls, McBride ended the 1901 season playing in the first season of the American League with the Milwaukee Brewers. After his season with the Canaries, Disch also moved to the Milwaukee Brewers in 1902.

=== 1902 & 1903: Iowa–South Dakota League ===
After the 1901 team played in an informal league, minor league baseball began with the 1902 Sioux Falls Canaries, who became members of the Class D level Iowa–South Dakota League.

The Iowa–South Dakota League contained six teams in its inaugural minor league season. Sioux Falls joined the Flandreau Indians, Le Mars Blackbirds, Rock Rapids Browns, Sheldon and Sioux City Cornhuskers teams as league charter members in 1902. The newly formed league began its season schedule on May 27, 1902.

The National Association of Professional Baseball Leagues, known today as Minor League Baseball, was organized at a meeting in Chicago, Illinois on September 5, 1901. The Iowa-South Dakota League was one of the original 14 minor leagues that began play in 1902. As the Iowa–South Dakota League teams were forming, Sioux Falls and Rock Rapids had conflicts over two players. Both Sioux Falls and Rock Rapids were attempting to sign Fred Carisch and Harry Swalm to their rosters. Eventually, Rock Rapids dropped their claim to Carisch who signed with Sioux Falls.

Sioux Falls native Bobby Warner became the 33-year-old player-manager of the Canaries in their first minor league season. Warner had previously played in the minor leagues with four different teams in the Western Association before his first stint as a manager with his hometown team.

During the 1902 season, Sioux Falls had league leading records of 23-5 on July 3 and 30-10 on July 18 in the first half standings. In the second half standings, Sioux Falls was 25-10, behind only the 26-7 Flandreau Indians on September 12 in the second half standings. On September 23, a newspaper article indicated that all of the league teams lost money except Sioux City, which claimed a $2,500 profit for the season.

In their first season of minor league play, the Sioux Falls Canaries won the 1902 South Dakota League championship. During the season, the Flandreau franchise did not join the league and begin play until June 29. After joining the league, Flandreau was awarded a record of 9-9 when beginning play. This made which made its overall first-half record 31-22. The Canaries had the league's best overall record, finishing 65-24 and a mere ½ game ahead of Flandreau. Sheldon won 15 total games and finished in last place, 49.0 games behind Sioux Falls. The Sioux Falls player/manager Bobby Warner appeared in 81 games and the team owner was Charles Craig.

The 1902 Iowa–South Dakota League played a split season schedule, and Sioux Falls won the first half pennant, with Flandreau winning the second half pennant. However, Flandreau folded before a scheduled playoff between the two teams and did not play, leaving Sioux Falls as the champion.

Pitcher Harry Swain of Sioux Falls won 23 games in 1902 to lead the South Dakota League, while his teammate Joe Corbett finished with a 15-2 record. Moose Baxter hit 21 home runs, a high total for the era and also scored 63 runs to lead the league in both categories. Baxter later played briefly with the 1907 St. Louis Cardinals, appearing in 6 games.

Catcher Fred Carisch played for Sioux Falls in 1902, appearing in 78 games at age 20. Following his season with the Canaries, Carisch made his major league debut in 1903. Carisch played in the major leagues with the Pittsburgh Pirates (1903–1906), Cleveland Naps (1912–1914) and Detroit Tigers (1923), hitting .227 in 226 career games. Before his final major league appearances as a coach-player with Detroit in 1923, Carisch returned to Sioux Falls serving as the team's player/manager from 1920 to 1922.

An organizational meeting was held in May 1903 for the second season of the Class D level Iowa–South Dakota League. The Flandreau and Rock Rapids franchises did not send a representative to the meeting, and the franchises were folded. Sioux Falls was represented at the meeting by owner Charles Craig, LeMars by Bobby Black, Sioux City by Dr. George B. Wood, Charles Hughson and Frank Lohr. The Council Bluffs Bluffers franchise was selected to join the league, represented at the meeting by Buck Keith and Frank Wilson. J. U. Sammis, a Le Mars, Iowa attorney, was named as the 1903 president of the Iowa–South Dakota League.

The Flandreau and Rock Rapids teams did not return as the Iowa–South Dakota League reduced to four teams in playing its 1903 season. Bobby Warner returned as the Canaries' manager. Sioux Falls ended the 1903 season in last place. The Canaries ended the season with a 40-42 record, finishing 8.0 games behind the Le Mars Blackbirds, who captured the 1903 Iowa–South Dakota championship with Hall of Famer Branch Rickey on their roster. No league playoff was held. Frank Lohr of Sioux Falls scored 62 runs to lead the league. Player/manager Bobby Warner played in 56 games for the Canaries and batted .256 on the season.

Infielder Clyde Williams played for the Canaries in both the 1902 and 1903 seasons. Following his time with Sioux Falls, Williams played for various minor league teams through the 1910 season before embarking on a collegiate coaching career. Prior to joining Sioux Falls, Williams had been a star player on both the football and baseball teams at the University of Iowa, graduating in the spring of 1902. In four years as a starting quarterback at Iowa, Williams never lost a game, compiling a 23–0–3 record as the starter. In his collegiate career, Williams earned 11 letters at Iowa, four in football, four in baseball, and three in track. Following his tenure with Sioux Falls, Williams became an assistant football coach for Iowa State University and eventually served as the Iowa State Cyclones football head football coach from 1907 to 1912 with a record of 32–15–2. Simultaneously, Williams was the school's first Iowa State coach from 1908 to 1911, with a 20–29 record in beginning the program. He also served as the Iowa State baseball coach. He became the ISU athletic director, serving in that role from 1914 to 1919. He was the namesake of Iowa State's home football stadium from 1915 through 1975, which was named Clyde Williams Field in Williams's honor. Iowa State moved to the new Jack Trice Stadium in 1976.

The Iowa–South Dakota League did not return to play in 1904, permanently folding following the 1903 season. After the 1903 season, Sioux Falls did host another minor league team for the next 16 seasons following the demise of the Iowa–South Dakota League.

After his hometown team left minor league baseball, Bobby Warner became the player/manager of the Marshalltown Grays in 1904, beginning a two-season tenure managing the team in the Iowa State League.

=== 1920 to 1923: Soos / South Dakota League ===
Minor league baseball returned to Sioux Falls in 1920. Known by a new nickname, a new Sioux Falls team was formed and began play as charter members of the Class D level South Dakota League, as the eight-team league was formed for the 1920 season. True to its name, Sioux Falls and the other seven member teams were all based in cities within the state of South Dakota. The 1920 South Dakota League created the opportunity for professional baseball to be played in the South Dakota for the first time in 16 years, since the demise of the 1903 Iowa-South Dakota League with Sioux Falls. The other seven South Dakota League members were hosting minor league teams in their cities for the first time.

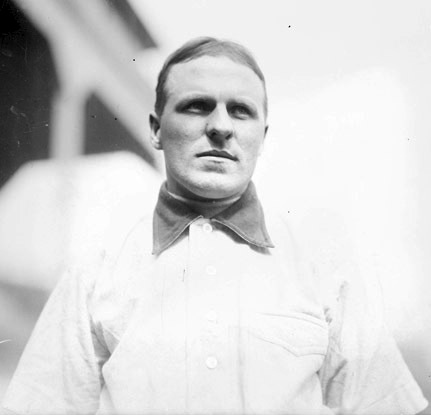
(1905) Fred Carisch, Pittsburgh Pirates. Carisch played for Sioux Falls in 1902 and returned to become the player-manager for the team from 1920 to 1922.

The newly formed Sioux Falls team was known by the "Soos" nickname, a phonetic play on "Sioux." The nickname had been used previously by the nearby Sioux City, Iowa based Sioux City Soos teams. The Sioux Falls Soos joined with the Aberdeen Boosters, Huron Packers, Madison Greys, Miller Climbers, Mitchell Kernels, Redfield Reds, and Wessington Springs Saints teams as the 1920 South Dakota League charter franchises. The league began its first season schedule of games on May 18, 1920.

Former 1902 Sioux Falls catcher Fred Carisch returned to Sioux Falls to become the Soos' player-manager in 1920, having played seven major league seasons following his first tenure with Sioux Falls. Returning to the franchise he had played for in 1902, Carisch batted .275 for the Soos playing first base and catcher in 85 total games at age 38. Living in Minneapolis before beginning a three year tenure as the Sioux Fall player/manager, Carisch made his off-season home in Sioux Falls, where he worked selling Studebakers and Reo automobiles in the winter months.

In June, during the 1920 season, the ballpark grandstand at Nelson Field in Sioux Falls was struck by a tornado and destroyed.

In their first season in the new league, the Soos finished as the runner-up in the 1920 South Dakota League final standings. Sioux Falls ended the season with a 58-40 record and finished in second place under player/manager Fred Carisch. The Soos finished 3½ games behind the first place Mitchell Kernels in the final standings. Sioux Falls pitcher George Stueland had a strong season and led the South Dakota League with both 22 wins and 212 strikeouts.

George Stueland played in the first of two seasons for Sioux Falls in 1920. Following his second season with Sioux Falls, Stueland played in the major leagues, with the Chicago Cubs. He pitched for the Cubs from 1921–1923 and in 1925, winning 9 total major league games in his career.

Phil Cooney started the 1920 season with Sioux Falls, his fifth in total with the team. Cooney had started a taxicab business in Sioux Falls and received numerous tickets for speeding. After playing one game with Sioux Falls in 1920, Cooney let the team to play for a Luverne, Minnesota town team. He remained under contract to Sioux Falls in minor league baseball, and the Soos proceeded to trade Cooney to the Sioux City Packers, for whom he played in 60 games.

The Sioux Falls Soos continued play in the South Dakota League in 1921. The 1921 league was also known by the shortened Dakota League, as a Wahpeton, North Dakota based team joined the league. The new Wahpeton–Breckenridge Twins and Watertown Cubs teams replaced the folded Miller Climbers and Wessington Springs Saints in league play. The returning Aberdeen Grays, Huron Packers, Madison Greys, Mitchell Kernels and Redfield Red Sox teams completed the eight-team league.

On September 7, 1921, Sioux Falls hosted Redfield on a muddy field. The two teams combined for four hits in a 1-0 Sioux Falls victory. Sioux Falls scored their run in the first inning, and 39-year-old Soos pitcher Clarence Nelson held the lead pitching a complete game 1 hit shutout. The game lasted 1 hour and 12 minutes. The Soos again ended the season as the league runner up for the second consecutive season.

George Stueland returned to pitch for Sioux Falls in 1921 and compiled a 22-9 record on the season. Following his strong campaign with Sioux Falls, Stueland made his major league debut with the Chicago Cubs following the conclusion of the South Dakota League season. Before the final Sioux Falls home game, the Sioux Falls team presented Stueland with a gold watch and a pair of spikes, and fans passed the hat collecting money to present to Stueland prior to his departure to Chicago.

As Sioux Falls again finished as the league runner up, the Mitchell Kernels won their second consecutive league championship in 1921. In the final standings, the Kernels finished 3.0 games ahead of the Sioux Fall Soos in the eight-team league. The Soos ended the season with a 61-35 record, playing the season under returning manager Fred Carisch. No league playoffs were held in 1921. George Stueland led the league with both 22 wins and 169 strikeouts on the season. In 1921, Sioux Falls player/manager Fred Carish batted .297 playing 49 games at catcher at age 39.

In 1922, the Soos continued play as the eight-team South Dakota League remained as a Class D level league. After two consecutive second place finishes, the Soos ended the 1923 season in fourth place. In a close final standings, Sioux Falls finished 5.0 games behind the first place Mitchell Kernels and just 0.5 game behind both the Aberdeen Grays and Fargo Athletics who had identical 56-42 records. The Soos were just behind with a record of 55-42, playing in their final season under Fred Carisch. At age 40, player/manager Carisch batted .309 playing 33 games at catcher in 1922.

In a game at home on September 8, 1922, prominent Negro Leagues pitcher Bill Drake threw a no-hitter for the All Nations barnstorming team against the Sioux Falls Soos in an exhibition game. In the game at Nelson Field in Sioux Falls, Drake held the Sioux Falls Soos hitless in a 4-0 victory. Sioux Falls' Clarence Nelson was the losing pitcher in the contest.

Following the 1922 season Fred Carisch's tenure ended as the Sioux Falls player-manager when he returned to the major leagues for a coaching position with the Detroit Tigers, becoming the pitching coach for the Tigers. While serving as the pitching coach, Carisch even appeared briefly as a player for Detroit in 1923 at age 42. Carisch later served one game as the Detroit manager in 1924 in the absence of Detroit manager Ty Cobb. On September 28, 1923, on the last day of the season, Carisch was the manager as the Tigers lost the game 16-1 to the Chicago White Sox in Cobb's absence. The game was the only major league game in Carisch's managerial career.

In 1923, the South Dakota League was split into two four-team leagues. Sioux Falls remained in the South Dakota League, which continued play as four–team Class D level league. The Soos joined the Aberdeen Grays, Mitchell Kernels and Watertown Cubs as member franchises. The North Dakota League formed the counterpart four–team Class D league, comprising the returning Jamestown Jimkotas, and three new franchises: the Minot Magicians, New Rockford-Carrington Twins and Bismarck Capitals to begin the season.

Canadian Jack Beatty, a veteran minor league player and manager, became the Sioux Falls manager for the 1923 season. Beatty had played in 1922 with the London Tecumsehs in the Michigan-Ontario League, serving as the first baseman for London.

The South Dakota League folded on July 17, 1923, with the Sioux Falls Soos in first place. Sioux Falls had a 35–22 record at the time the league folded. Playing under manager Jack Beaty, the Soos finished their shortened season a mere ½ game ahead of the second place Aberdeen Greys. The Minot Magicians won the North Dakota League with a 48–21 record. Both of the Dakota based leagues permanently folded after the 1923 season.

Sioux Falls player Frank Naleway won the South Dakota League batting title in 1923, hitting .337. Soos pitcher William Ludolph led the league with 77 strikeouts to go with his 10–3 record in the shortened season. Following the folding of the league Jack Beaty returned to the London Tecumsehs and played 45 games for them, finishing the season as London's player/manager.

=== 1924: Tri State League Co-champions ===
After the folding of the South Dakota League in the middle of the 1923 season, Sioux Falls resumed play in 1924 in a newly formed league, with the team becoming known again by the "Canaries" nickname. The Canaries became members of the Class D level Tri State League. Sioux Falls won their second consecutive league championship in the new league.

A former minor league player, team owner Rex Stucker was also a former Sioux Falls player and established the Sioux Falls team in the new league. Stucker would remain as the owner of the Sioux Falls franchise until 1947.

The Sioux Falls Canaries joined the Beatrice Blues, Grand Island Islanders, Hastings Cubs, Norfolk Elk Horns and Sioux City Cardinals (St. Louis Cardinals affiliate) teams in the newly formed league. The Tri State League season schedule began on May 4, 1924.

A veteran minor league manager joined Sioux Falls in 1924. Frank Boyle had first served as a player/manager in 1904 with the Fort Dodge Gypsum Eaters. The 47-year-old Boyle joined Sioux Falls after a four-year tenure as manager with the Marshalltown Ansons in the Class D level Mississippi Valley League.

The Tri State League season was short lived and the league folded July 17, 1924. The Sioux Falls Canaries finished in a virtual tie for first place with the Beatrice Blues when the league folded during the season. Both teams had identical records of 35-30, as Frank Boyle managed the Canaries for the totality of their shortened season. The Norfolk Elk Horns (31-30) finished in third place, ending the season 2.0 games behind the co-champions. Outfielder Graeme Snow of Sioux Falls won the Tri State League batting title, hitting .339 in the league season.

Following the folding of the Tri State League, Frank Boyle immediately returned to his former team and managed the Marshalltown Ansons for the remainder of their Mississippi Valley League season.

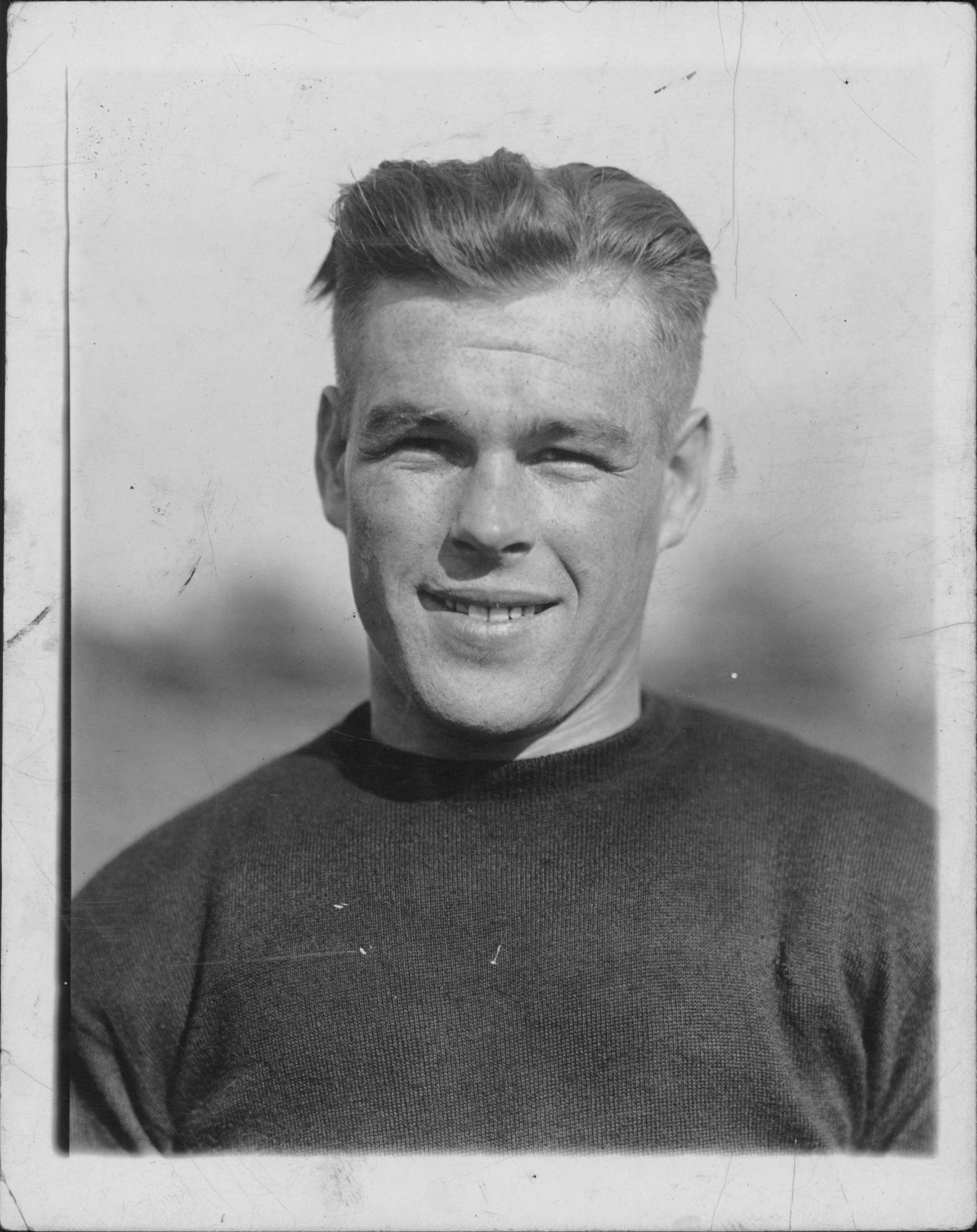
Frank Cleve. Cleve batted .333 for the 1924 Sioux Falls championship team before embarking on a collegiate coaching career following the season.

Frank Cleve played infield for the Canaries in 1924, batting .333 while appearing in 21 games. A multi-sport athlete, who was also a former college football, basketball and baseball player, Cleve graduated from St. Olaf College in the spring of 1924 prior to joining the Canaries roster. In 1925 after his season with Sioux Falls, Cleve became a collegiate coach and the athletic director at Spokane College, succeeding Abe Cohn in the role. He next served as the head football coach at Concordia College in Moorhead, Minnesota from 1926 to 1935, compiling a record of 30–30–13. Cleve was simultaneously the head basketball coach at Concordia from 1927 to 1936, tallying a mark of 86–84.

After the folding of the Tri State League, Sioux Falls was without a minor league team until 1933, when the Canaries joined a new league 9 years after the Tri State League folded.

Rex Stucker returned to Sioux Falls in 1930 and founded a semi-professional Canaries team. The independent team played in tournaments throughout the Midwest and in Denver, Colorado through the 1932 season. The Canaries played in 1930 and 1931 with catcher (and future Canaries manager) Ralph Brandon and pitcher Claude Bradford on their roster.

=== 1933: Canaries join Nebraska State League ===
After a nine-year absence from minor league baseball, the Sioux Falls Canaries joined a new league in 1933. The Canaries became members of four-team Class D level Nebraska State League for the 1933 season. Team owner Rex Stucker managed the team. The Nebraska State League reduced from a six-team league to a four-team league in 1933, after the Grand Island Islanders, McCook Generals and North Platte Buffaloes teams folded following the 1932 season. Sioux Falls was the only team not based in Nebraska and the Canaries joined the returning Beatrice Blues, Lincoln Links and Norfolk Elks teams in the league. The four Nebraska State League member teams were all noted to be affiliated with the St. Louis Cardinals in 1933.

During the 1933 season, former Chicago White Sox player Swede Risberg, who was banned from major league baseball due to his involvement due to the 1919 Black Sox Scandal, tried to take over the Canaries as manager, appealing to the team players and the owner/manager. The Sioux Falls owner/manager Rex Stucker kicked Risberg out of the locker room.

In their first season of Nebraska State League play, the Sioux Falls Canaries ended the season in third place, finishing the season 3.5 games behind the first place Norfolk Elks. The Canaries ended the season with a record of 57-49, playing under manager Rex Stucker. Sioux Falls finished 3.5 games behind Norfolk Elks and 3.0 games behind second place Beatrice in the overall standings. Sioux Falls did not qualify for the playoff where Beatrice defeated Norfolk 5 games to 4. Canaries pitcher Rip Schroeder won 20 games to lead the Nebraska State League, while teammate Sam Conaway had a league best 2.43 ERA.

Outfielder Oris Hockett played for the Canaries in 1933, batting .337 with 9 home runs in 103 games at age 23. After breaking into the major leagues at age 28, Hockett was a major league All-Star in 1944. Hockett played in the major leagues with the Brooklyn Dodgers (1938–1939), Cleveland Indians (1941–1944) and Chicago White Sox (1945), batting .276 in 551 career games.

=== 1934 to 1938: Three Nebraska State League pennants ===
Sioux Falls continued membership, as the Nebraska State League played again as a four team, Class D level league in 1934.

The Canaries ended the season in third place with a record of 50-60. Managed by Rex Stucker, Sioux Falls finished 19.0 games behind the first place Lincoln Links in the final standings. No playoffs were held as Lincoln became the league champions. For the second consecutive season, the four Nebraska State League member teams were all cited as affiliates of the St. Louis Cardinals in 1934.

The 1935 Sioux Falls Canaries won the pennant in the four-team Nebraska State League. The Canaries won the league pennant in 1935 after they ended the regular season with a 72-40 record to finish in first place manager Ralph Brandon. Brandon began a five-season tenure as the Canaries' player-manager, that was marked by numerous pennants and a championship. Sioux Falls finished 11.5 games ahead of the second place Norfolk Elks in the standings. Sioux Falls then lost in the Nebraska State League final, where Norfolk defeated the Canaries 4 games to 3. Sioux Falls pitcher Claude Bradford compiled 17 wins to top the league in victories. His teammate Tony A. Johnson led Nebraska State League pitchers with 2.14 ERA.

Primarily a catcher, Ralph Brandon was a Sioux Falls resident who began first played with the Canaries in 1933, at age 28. Brandon began his professional baseball career with the 1925 Ottumwa Cardinals at age 20. With the Canaries Brandon batted .283 with 2 home runs in 98 games on the 1935 season in his role as player/manager.

The Sioux Falls Canaries won their second consecutive Nebraska State League pennant in 1936, as Ralph Brandon returned to serve as the player/manager. The league began the season as a six-team league, as Sioux Falls finished with a record of 71-49 to end the regular season in first place, 2.0 games ahead of the second place Mitchell Kernels. During the season, the Lincoln Links (26-38) and the Fairbury Jeffs (19-44) teams were both folded on July 16 and league continued play as a four-team league for the remainder of the season. In the four-team playoffs Sioux Falls first defeated, Beatrice 3 games to 2 to advance. In the final Mitchell defeated the Canaries 4 games to 2 to claim the championship. Sioux Falls pitcher Frank Wagner led the Nebraska State League with both 21 wins and 3.07 ERA, while his teammate Bobby Swan had a league leading 267 strikeouts. Player/manager Ralph Brandon batted .319 with 4 home, 71 RBIs and 96 walks in 113 games on the season, splitting time between first base and catcher.

Pitcher Red Anderson began his professional baseball career in 1936 with the Canaries. Wilson had a record of 9–7 in 23 appearances. Anderson would return to Sioux Falls in 1937. In his major league career with the Washington Senators (1937, 1940–1941) Anderson had a 5-8 record in 36 games. Anderson's major league career was interrupted his service in the United States Navy during World War II, beginning in 1942. He was stationed at Pearl Harbor during his service. Anderson completed his military service in 1945 and briefly returned to baseball, rejoining Sioux Falls.

After ending the 1936 season playing as a four-team league, the 1937 Nebraska State League again became a six-team league in 1937, and Sioux Falls had a championship season. The Fairbury Jeffs returned to the league and the Grand Island Red Birds replaced Lincoln. Sioux Falls was the only league team without a major league affiliate sponsorship. With Red Anderson returning to the team, dominating on the mound and the Canaries won the league championship to complete a three-season pennant streak. Anderson compiled a 20–8 record with Sioux Falls before making his major debut with the Washington Senators following the completion of the Nebraska State League season. The Canaries ended the season in first place with a record of 83-36, winning another pennant under manager Ralph Brandon. The Canaries finished 6.5 games ahead of the second place Mitchell Kernels and with no league playoffs being held and the Canaries became Nebraska State League champions. Pitcher Frank Wagner returned to the Canaries and led the league with 25 wins, while teammate Bobby Swan led the league with a 2.35 ERA along with his 18-3 record. Sioux Falls's Harold Schmiel led the league with 140 RBIs and Frank Mahacek scored 129 runs to top the league. Player/manager Ralph Brandon batted .294 with 8 home runs, in 96 games on the season.

Knuckleball pitcher Roger Wolff played for the 1937 Canaries championship team at age 27, compiling a 5-3 record and a 2.92 ERA with Sioux Falls, who were his fourth team of the season. Wolff later made his major league debut at age 30, and pitched in the major leagues for the Philadelphia Athletics (1941–1943), Washington Senators (1944–1946), Cleveland Indians (1947) and Pittsburgh Pirates (1947). In 1945, Wolff had a 20–10 record with an ERA of 2.12 pitching for the Senators. Wolff had a major league career record of 52–69, with a 3.41 ERA. pitching in 182 games with 63 complete games, eight shutouts and 12 career saves. After baseball, he became a prison administrator, serving as the athletic director at the Southern Illinois Penitentiary.

Ralph Brandon returned as player/manager in 1938 and the Nebraska State League pennant streak for Sioux Falls ended with a last place finish in the six-team league. The Canaries ended the 1938 season in last place as the defending champions. Sioux Falls ended the season with a record of 49-68 to finish in sixth place under manager Ralph Brandon. The Canaries finished 21.0 games behind Sioux City Cowboys and did not qualify for the playoff won by the Norfolk Elks over Sioux City. Sioux City pitcher Cletus Voss led the league with a 2.33 ERA. Sioux Falls player/manager Ralph Brandon batted .201 in 112 games on the season, at age 33.

Led by league returning league president J. Roy Carter, the Nebraska State League changed names for the 1939 season.

=== 1939 to 1941: Western League ===
The Canaries continued play in a newly named league in 1939, as the Nebraska State League was renamed and become known as the Western League. J. Roy Carter, who had served as president of the Nebraska State League since 1934, remained as president of the Western League, which formed as a Class D level league. Sioux Falls became an affiliate team for the first time, becoming a minor league affiliate of the Chicago Cubs for the season. The Sioux Falls Canaries, Lincoln Links (St. Louis Browns), Norfolk Elks (New York Yankees) and Sioux City Cowboys (Detroit Tigers) franchises remained from the Nebraska State League. Those teams were joined in the new league by the Mitchell Kernels and Worthington, Minnesota based Worthington Cardinals (St. Louis Cardinals).

In 1939, the Canaries had regular season record of 66-52 and placed second in the six–team Western League regular season standings, qualifying for the playoffs. Playing their final season with Ralph Brandon as player/manager Sioux Falls finished 8½ games behind the first place Norfolk Elks in the final standings. With their second-place finish, Sioux Falls qualified for the four–team playoffs. The Canaries lost in the first round of the playoffs 3 games to 2 to the Lincoln Links, who advanced to the final where they lost to the Sioux City Cowboys. Howard Conners of Sioux Falls won the Western League batting title, hitting.365. Canaries' pitcher Lawrence Kempe had 3.03 ERA to lead the league while compiling a record of 19-7 on the season.

Player/manager Ralph Brandon batted .226 in 77 games on the season. After leaving the Canaries, Brandon did not return to professional baseball in the 1940 season. Sioux Falls players Howard Connors hit .365 and Edward Wernet batted .362 to finish in the top four in the Western League.

==== 1940 championship season ====
Replacing Ralph Brandon, veteran minor league catcher Bob Fenner became the player/manager and the 1940 Sioux Falls Canaries won the Western League championship. The Canaries were unaffiliated in 1940, and the Class D level Western League was reduced to four teams, after the Lincoln Links and Mitchell Kernels did not return. Norfolk remained as a New York Yankees affiliate and Worthington a St. Louis Cardinals affiliate. The Canaries ended the regular season with a 59–50 record, placing second in the four–team Western League final standings. With Fenner leading the team for the entire 1940 season as manager, Sioux Falls finished 16½ games behind the first place Norfolk Yankees in the overall regular season standings.

For the 1940 season, the Western League schedule was uniquely played in four distinct quarter schedules, with a champion declared in each quarter. Norfolk won the first, second and fourth quarters, while Sioux Falls won the third quarter of the season schedule. The two teams then met in a championship series. In the Finals, the Sioux Falls Canaries won the title by defeating Norfolk 4 games to 2 to claim the Western League championship. Sioux Falls pitcher Frank Wagner led the league with both 17 wins and 193 strikeouts at age 29. Tony Koenig batted .334 and Howard Connors batted .332 for the Canaries to both finish in the top 5 in the league in hitting.

The left-handed hitting Fenner played his final professional season at age 32, hitting .344 with 3 home runs while appearing in 112 games as player/manager. Prior to joining the Canaries, Fenner had a 10-season tenure playing for the St. Paul Saints and joined Sioux Falls for his first managerial role. Fenner had a lifetime batting average of .310 playing in 13 minor league seasons. A Beeville, Texas native, Fenner had retired after the 1938 season, but came out of retirement to accept the position with Sioux Falls for one final season, leading the team to the championship.

==== 1941: Dizzy Dean ====
As defending league champions, the 1941 Sioux Falls Canaries defended their title in the six-team, Class D level Western League The Western League expanded to six teams as the league dropped the Worthington Cardinals as a member and added the Cheyenne Indians, Denver Bears and Pueblo Rollers (St. Louis Browns) teams for the 1941 season.

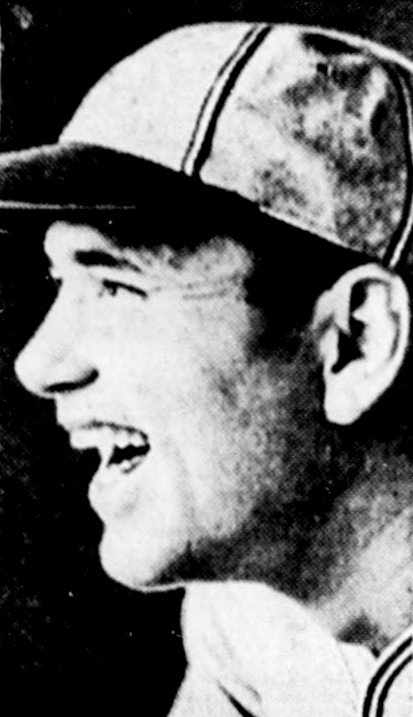
(1941) Baseball Hall of Fame member Dizzy Dean. Dean pitched in one home game for the Canaries in 1941, as he ended his career due to injury.

With an injured pitching arm at age 31, Baseball Hall of Fame member Dizzy Dean pitched in one game for the Canaries in 1941, concluding his career. Dean began the 1941 season pitching for the Chicago Cubs. Dean tried to pitch through pain in his pitching arm. Due to his ineffectiveness and the pain in his arm, Dean retired as a player during the 1941 season. He remained with Chicago, briefly coaching with the Cubs. He soon left the Cubs and moved into the broadcast booth, announcing games for the St. Louis Browns after making his announcing debut during the Browns' game on July 6, 1941.

On July 13, 1941, Dean was on a barnstorming tour in the region promoting his announcing role for the Browns when he made a surprise pitching appearance. Dean pitched for the Sioux Falls Canaries against Pueblo with 3,000 fans in attendance at Sioux Falls. In his appearance with Sioux Falls, Dean pitched three innings and allowed no runs and one hit in the 4-1 Canaries victory. Dean continued as baseball announcer following the end of his playing career. Dean was inducted into the Baseball Hall of Fame in 1954.

Former player/manager Ralph Brandon returned to the team in 1941, appearing as a catcher 8 games at age 36, batting .241.

The Canaries did not qualify for the four-team playoffs in the 1941 Western League. The Canaries ended the regular season in fifth place with a record of 51-56. Playing the season under managers Bob Fenner, who returned to the team and his replacement, Tony Koenig, Sioux Falls finished 12.0 games behind the first place Norfolk Yankees and ahead of the Denver Bears in the regular season standings. In the playoffs, the Pueblo Rollers won the championship with a victory in the finals 3 games to 2 over Norfolk. Pitcher Frank Wagner returned to the Canaries and despite an 11-18 record, led the league with a 2.15 ERA in 40 games and 238 innings with 18 complete games. An outfielder and a catcher, Tony Koenig began playing with Sioux Falls in 1935 and the managerial role was the first of his career at age 30. He batted .285 with a .399 OBP for the Canaries in 1941, while appearing in 103 games. Koenig also led the Western League with 45 stolen bases.

Outfielder Chuck Orsborn played his final minor league season with Sioux Falls in 1941, batting .209 in 42 games at age 23. In 1941, after his season with Sioux Falls, Orsborn enlisted in the United States Army Air Corps , where he serving five years during World War II, attaining the rank of Lieutenant Colonel during his service. Having played baseball, basketball, football and track and field at Bradley University, Orsborn returned to Bradley after his military service to begin a long tenure as a coach and athletic director. After serving as an assistant basketball coach for the Bradley Braves men's basketball team, Orsborn became the Braves' head basketball coach in 1956 and coached Bradley through 1965, compiling a 194–56 record, winning three National Invitation Tournament titles in (1957, 1960 and 1964) while being named the Missouri Valley Conference Men's Basketball Coach of the Year in 1960 and 1962. He then served as the athletic director at Bradley from 1965 to 1978 following his coaching career. In 2002, Orsborn was named Bradley's "Coach of the Century." Today, Bradley University Athletics names an annual recipient of the Charles Orsborn Award.

With World War II underway, the Western League did not return to play in 1942, one of many minor leagues that paused play during the war. After the conclusion of World War II, the Western League resumed play in 1947 as a six-team league without Sioux Falls as a member, as the Canaries became members of another league in 1947.

=== 1942: Canaries join Northern League ===
In 1942, Rex Stucker remained as the team owner and the Sioux Falls Canaries continued play in a new league following the folding of the Western League.

The Sioux Falls Canaries joined the Northern League in 1942, beginning a long tenure of numerous Sioux Falls teams playing in different incarnations of the league, a longevity of league membership that stretched to the 2005 season. In 1942, the Sioux Falls team replaced the folded Crookston Pirates franchise in the eight-team Class C level league. Sioux Falls joined with he Duluth Dukes (St. Louis Cardinals affiliate), Eau Claire Bears, Fargo-Moorhead Twins, Grand Forks Chiefs, Superior Blues (Chicago White Sox), Wausau Timberjacks (Cleveland Indians) and Winnipeg Maroons teams in the league. The Northern League began its schedule on May 7, 1942.

First baseman Joe Bosse became the Canaries' player-manager for the 1942 season, as Tony Koenig remained on the team as a player. Bosse had played for Sioux Falls in 1933 and returned as a player in 1941, before gaining his new position with the team.

In their first season of Northern League play, Sioux Falls qualified for the four-team playoffs with their fourth-place regular season finish and advanced to the Final. The Canaries ended the season under .500, with a record of 57–60 record. Led by player/ manager Joe Bosse, Sioux Falls finished 15½ games behind the first place Eau Claire Bears. In the four-team playoffs the Canaries were tied 2 games to 2 with the Winnipeg Maroons. The winner was set to play the Wausau Timberjacks, who had just defeated Eau Clarie 4 games to 1. However, Wausau folded following their series victory. As a result, the Winnipeg-Sioux Falls was extended into a Final. Winnipeg then defeated Sioux Falls 5 games to 4 in the extended series to win the league championship. Player/manager Joe Bosse hit .276 in 113 games with 11 triples and 0 home runs, playing in his final season at age 32. In his fifth total season with Sioux Falls at age 32, Frank Wagner won 17 games, second in the league and had a 2.52 ERA, third best in the league while pitching 239 innings for the Canaries.

Playing in his ninth overall season for his hometown team, Ralph Brandon returned briefly, playing his final season for the Canaries in 1942 at age 37. A resident of Sioux Falls, Brandon was killed on August 24, 1945, he was when struck by a car just outside of Sioux Falls. Brandon was walking back to town after his car had broken down on the highway and was struck. Brandon is buried in the St. Michael Cemetery in Sioux Falls.

The Northern League paused play following the 1942 season due to World War II and the league did not play for the next three seasons. Sioux Falls returned to the league when play resumed. There were only 10 total minor leagues that played a season schedule for the 1943 season.

=== 1946: Northern League resumes play ===
After a three-season hiatus, the Class C level Northern League resumed play in 1946 following the conclusion of World War II. The eight-team league reformed with the Aberdeen Pheasants (St. Louis Browns affiliate) and St. Cloud Rox (New York Giants) teams replacing former league member Wausau and Winnipeg teams. The Sioux Falls Canaries resumed league membership as an unaffiliated team along with the Duluth Dukes (St. Louis Cardinals), Eau Claire Bears, Fargo-Moorhead Twins, Grand Forks Chiefs (Brooklyn Dodgers) and Superior Blues (Chicago White Sox), who all resumed league play as well. The reformed Northern League began its schedule on May 19, 1946.

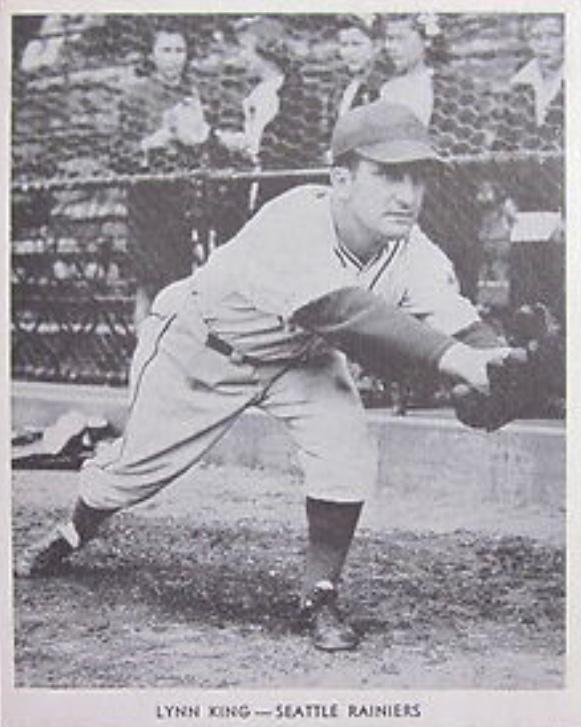
(1943) Lynn King, Seattle Rainiers Lynn was the Sioux Falls player/manager in 1946 after first playing with the Canaries in 1933.

Outfielder Lynn King became the Sioux Falls player/manager in 1946. King had previously played for Sioux Falls in 1933, when he hit .309 as an outfielder. Following his first season with the Canaries, King played briefly with the St. Louis Cardinals (1935–1936, 1939), batting .208 in 175 career games. The 1949 season was the final season of King's career at age 38.

After completing his four-year military service in World War II, pitcher Red Anderson returned to Sioux Falls and played a final season in 1946 at age 34. Anderson began the season pitching with the Aberdeen Pheasants before returning to the Canaries. He compiled a 12–13 record with a 3.63 ERA in 32 games in his final professional season.

In returning to Northern League play, the Canaries ended the 1946 season in seventh place in the eight-team league. Sioux Falls ended the season with a record of 41–68, playing the season under player/manager Lynn King. The Canaries finished 34½ games behind the first place St. Cloud Rox (71–31) in the regular season. With their seventh place finish, Sioux Falls did not qualify for the four-team playoffs won by St. Cloud over Fargo-Moorehead in the finals. Appearing in 60 games as an outfielder, player/manager Lynn King batted .333, with 0 home runs and 27RBIs. King also made the first pitching appearances of his career, throwing 15 total innings in 5 appearances on the mound. In his first professional season, pitching in 171 innings at age 23, Sioux Falls pitcher Stanley King surrendered 162 total runs, with 54 of the runs being unearned. King finished the season with 9–13 record and a 5.68 ERA.

=== 1947: Northern League championship ===
Prior to the 1947 season, longtime owner Rex Stucker sold the Sioux Falls Canaries franchise to Mory Levinger. Lovinger was a local businessman and the owner of Mory's Happy Hour Bar in downtown Sioux Falls. After obtaining ownership of the Canaries, Levinger reached agreement with the Chicago Cubs for the Canaries to again become an affiliate of the Cubs. After obtaining the team, Levinger remained as the Sioux Falls team owner until 1953.

Levinger's establishment, Mory's Happy Hour Bar was located at 303 South Phillips in Sioux Falls. The bar had a phrase: "Mory, among his assets likes to count the only one that money cannot buy YOUR GOOD WILL... and we extend to you, not as a customer, but as a friend, our best wishes and hospitality." The bar opened with Levinger as an owner in 1940 and it operated until 1972. Upon opening the bar in May of 1940, Lovinger obtained exclusive rights in Sioux Falls for Michelob and Budweiser beer. Levinger insisted that all whiskey served be at least 4 years old and stipulated that 15 brands of Scotch be available at all times. The drink menu included a drink called the "Blitzkreig." Only one Blitzkreig was allowed to be served to a customer. The drink was "expensive," but the drink price also included "taxi fare home."

Veteran baseball man Jim Oglesby began a successful two season stint as the Sioux Falls manager in 1947. A long-time minor league player, who played briefly for the 1936 Philadelphia Athletics, Oglesby was in his first managerial role at age 41, having last played in 1942.

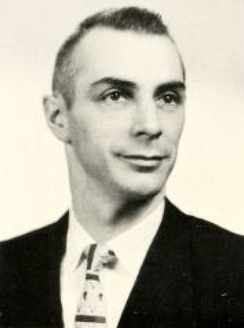
(1963) Dick Triptow, Lake Forest College basketball coach. Tiptrow played for the Canaries in 1947 while playing professional basketball with the National Basketball League champion Chicago Gears.

Led by Oglesby, Sioux Falls continued their Northern League membership in 1947 and won the league championship. Playing as a Chicago Cubs affiliate, the Canaries ended the eight-team Northern League regular season with a record of 75–43, placing second in the regular season standings. The Canaries finished 7.0 games behind the first place Aberdeen Pheasants and qualified for the playoffs, as Jim Oglesby served the entire season as the Sioux Falls manager. In the four-team playoffs the Canaries defeated the Duluth Dukes 3 games to 1 in the first round to advance. In the playoff finals Sioux Falls won the championship by beating Aberdeen 4 games to 2. With the franchise continuing to host their minor league home games at Sioux Falls Stadium, the Canaries drew a total of 116,683 in their 1947 championship season.

Dick Triptow played in the outfield for the championship Canaries team in 1947, batting .273, with 10 triples, 5 home runs and 63 RBIs in 93 games. A multi-sport athlete, also playing as a star softball player and basketball player, the 1947 season was Triptow's final professional baseball season at age 24. Prior to joining the Canaries for the 1947 season, Triptow played the professional basketball season with the 1946–47 Chicago Gears, who won the championship in the National Basketball League, defeating the Rochester Royals in the finals, led by Hall of Famer George Mikan. Triptow and Mikan had been college basketball teammates and co-captains on the DePaul Blue Demons men's basketball team under coach Ray Meyer. Triptow played professional basketball with the Chicago American Gears (1944–1947), Fort Wayne Zollner Pistons (1947–1948), Tri-Cities Blackhawks (1948), Fort Wayne Pistons 1948–1949) and Baltimore Bullets (1949). Triptow became a high school and collegiate basketball coach after his playing career concluded. From 1959 to 1973 he served as the head coach of the Lake Forest University Foresters men's basketball team.

=== 1948 to 1952: One Northern League championship ===
The Canaries were the defending league champions, as Jim Oglesby returned as the Sioux Falls manager in 1948. The Canaries had a seventh-place finish, missing the Northern League playoffs. Continuing as a Chicago Cubs affiliate, the Sioux Falls Canaries ended their 1948 Class C level league season with a record of 45–75. Their seventh-place finish in the regular season saw them complete the season 35½ games behind the first place Grand Forks Chiefs in the final standings. The Canaries did not qualify for the four-team playoffs won by the Grand Forks Chiefs who swept the Aberdeen Pheasants in the final.

Sioux Falls again missed the playoffs in 1949, while continuing Class C level Northern League play,The Chicago Cubs affiliate Sioux Falls Canaries of the Northern League ended the 1949 season in sixth place in the eight-team league with a record of 58–67, finishing 14.0 games behind the first place Eau Claire Bears. The Canaries were managed by Irvin Fortune and Lee Eilbracht during the season. With their sixth-place finish, Sioux Falls did not qualify for the four-team playoffs won by the Aberdeen Pheasants.

Both Irwin Fortune and Lee Eilbracht were catchers for the Canaries in 1949, as well as managing the team. Fortune began the season as the player/manager and appeared in 51 games with Sioux Falls, batting .281 before being elevated by the Cubs organization from Sioux Falls to the Class B level Springfield Cubs of the New England League to finish the season. In 1950, Fortune became the player/manager of the Nazareth Barons of the Class D level North Atlantic League.

Replacing Fortune as manager, Lee Eilbracht began a three-year tenure as the Sioux Falls' player/manager at age 25, batting .227 in 23 games in 1949. Eilbracht had played the previous season with the Class D level Clinton Giants], batting .315 on the season for Clinton.

Shortstop Sammy Gee played in 12 games for Sioux Falls in 1949 at age 21. Gee batted .135 before moving to the Grand Rapids Jets to conclude the season. Gee had played a portion of the previous season for the New York Cubans of the major league Negro National League, batting .200 for the Cubans in 12 games. Gee also played for the Olean Oilers in 1948, batting .321 in 21 games.

In 1950, Canaries owner Mory Lovinger donated new folding chairs to Augustana College in Sioux Falls. The chairs were for use in the newly remodeled lounge in the Men's Hall dorm on campus and the donation partnered with a lounge fund that was collected by the college student council.

The Canaries won the Northern League championship in 1950, their second league title in four seasons. With Lee Eilbracht continuing as manager, Sioux Falls ended the 1950 regular season in third place with a record of 70–55. The Canaries finished 3.0 games behind the first place St. Cloud Rox in the regular season standings of the eight-team Class C level league. The Eau Claire Bears finished in second place. In the four-team playoffs, Sioux Falls defeated the St. Cloud Rox 3 games to 0 to advance. In the finals the Canaries won the championship, beating the Superior Blues 4 games to 1.

Rube Walker played catcher for the Canaries championship team in 1950, batting .250 with 7 home runs in 83 games at age 21. After his minor league playing career ended, Walker became a popular coach in his tenure with the Chicago Cubs from 1961 until his death in 1971. Walker died at age 42 from leukemia on March 24, 1971, in Chicago. After his death, the Cubs established the Verlon "Rube" Walker Leukemia Center at Northwestern Memorial Hospital. Today, the Rube Walker Blood Center is still in operation at the hospital.

As the defending league champions, Sioux Falls ended the 1951 Northern League season in last place. Continuing play as a Chicago Cubs minor league affiliate, the Canaries ended the 1951 season with a record of 46–75, finishing in eighth place in the eight-team Northern League. Sioux Falls finished the season 31.0 games behind the first place Eau Claire Bears in the final regular season standings. The returning Lee Eilbracht began the season as player/manager before being replaced by Richard Lloyd during the season. Sioux Falls drew 50,466 in 1951, after drawing 94,001 in their 1950 championship season. With their last place finish, Sioux Falls did not qualify for the four-team playoffs, won by the Grand Forks Chiefs.

Following his tenure as a player/manager with Sioux Falls, Lee Eilbracht became a collegiate coach at the University of Illinois in 1952. Eilbracht remained as the head coach for the Fighting Illini until 1978, retiring as the school's all-time wins leader. Eilbracht was an also an Olympic coach for the 1964 United States Olympic baseball team. Eilbracht later became a consultant for the Arizona Diamondbacks during several spring training seasons.

At age 36, Al Kubski became the Sioux Falls manager in 1952 replacing Eilbracht. Kubiski came to Sioux Falls having served as the player-manager of the Lubbock Hubbers in 1951. Kubski played first base for the Canaries in his player/manager role.

The Canaries rebounded from their last place finish the season prior to finish in second place in the 1952 Northern League. In the regular season, the Canaries were the runner up of the Northern League with a record of 73–48. After finishing second, completing the season 7.0 games behind the first place Superior Blues, Sioux Falls qualified for the playoffs. Sioux Falls continued play as a Chicago Cubs minor league affiliate. In the playoffs, Sioux Falls Canaries defeated the Duluth Dukes 2 games to 1 to advance to the finals. In the finals, Sioux Falls lost as the Superior Blues won the title with 3 games to 0 series sweep over the Canaries. Player/manager Al Kubski appeared in 96 games at first base and batted .276 with 13 home runs and 61 RBIs on the season. Kubski did not return to Sioux Falls in 1953, but remained in the northern League, becoming the player/manager of the rival Cedar Rapids Indians.

In his second season with the team in 1952, Sioux Falls pitcher Don Elston had 18 wins on the season with a team-best 1.85 ERA. Following his strong season with the Canaries, Elston played made his debut in the major leagues with the Chicago Cubs in 1953. Elston returned to the minors before also playing with the, Brooklyn Dodgers in 1957 and Chicago Cubs from 1957–1964, where he became a two time All-star pitcher. Elston managed in the minor leagues with the Cubs organization following his playing career.

=== 1953: Northern League season / franchise relocated ===
For of the Canaries, the 1953 season proved to be the end of their tenure for their first span of membership in the Northern League. In their final season as a Chicago Cubs affiliate, Dale Lynch became the Sioux Falls player/manager and the team missed the four-team playoffs.

On opening day, May 6, 1953, the Fargo-Moorhead Twins defeated the Canaries at Fargo-Moorhead by the scored of 12–3 with 10,123 fans in attendance Barnett Field. Playing for the Twins, Roger Maris had his first professional baseball hit against the Canaries.

The Sioux Falls Canaries placed fifth in the Northern League regular season with a record of 59–65. Sioux Falls finished 26½ games behind the first place Fargo-Moorhead Twins in the final regular season standings. The Canaries missed the four-team playoffs with their fifth place finish as the Fargo-Moorhead Twins went on to sweep their playoff series en route to the championship. At age 33, Dale Lynch played the infield for Sioux Falls in his only career season as a player/manager. Lynch batted .324 with a .425 OBP with 2 home runs and 75 RBIs and had 72 bases on balls against 23 strikeouts at the plate in 124 games.

Infielder Sammy Gee returned to Sioux Falls in 1953, his second stint with the Canaries. Gee played briefly for the Canaries in 1953, appearing in 4 total games.

Following the 1953 season, Mory Levinger sold the franchise to new owners located in Winnipeg, Canada. Six years after selling the team, Levinger died on June 23, 1959, of a heart attack.

After Levinger sold the franchise, Sioux Falls was replaced in the 1954 Northern League season by the Winnipeg Goldeyes franchise. Winnipeg had previously been a member of the ManDak League, before joining the Northern League and becoming a St. Louis Cardinals affiliate.

=== 1964 & 1965: Sioux Falls joins amateur Basin League ===
In the winter of 1961, the Minnesota Twins and owner Clark Griffith explored locating a minor league team in Sioux Falls, but deemed the original ballpark at Sioux City Stadium unworthy and expressed the need for a stadium improvement in order to place a team in the city. This led to a local investment to totally rebuild the ballpark.

In 1964, with Sioux Falls Stadium newly remodeled, Sioux Falls resumed play as the Sioux Falls "Packers" collegiate amateur team was formed and became members of the six-team Basin League. The Basin League had been formed in 1954 as an invitation collegiate summer league. Team rosters initially had a few professional players on each roster joining with the collegiate players who were invited to join. Baseball Hall of Fame pitchers Bob Gibson and Jim Palmer had played in the league as amateurs prior to Sioux Falls becoming a league member.

The Sioux Falls "Packers" nickname corresponded to local industry as Sioux Falls was home to livestock and related meatpacking businesses beginning in the 1800s. John Morrell and Company opened a Sioux Falls operation in 1909 and became the city's primary industry employer, providing work with its Stockyards and adjacent meat packing facilities.

When Sioux Falls joined the league in 1964, the Basin league had evolved to become totally amateur, with collegiate players making up the totality of the team rosters. The league was an early incarnation of what is known today as collegiate summer baseball. In the era, the Basin League was praised as the top summer college league in the country. Contemporary leagues were the Cape Cod League and the Alaska Baseball League.

On June 18, 1964, the Sioux Falls Packers hosted their first home game at the rebuilt Sioux Falls Stadium. The Packers were victorious in their home opener 2-1 over the Rapid City Chiefs, with a crowd of over 1,300 in attendance. The Packers' Clyde Wright scored the winning run in the 10th inning. Later in their initial season, the Packers hosted an opening ceremony at the newly remodeled ballpark on July 4, 1964. Sioux Falls lost the game that day 4-1 to the Pierre Cowboys.

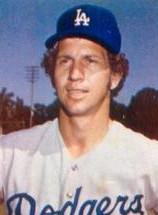
(1977) Don Sutton, Los Angeles Dodgers. At age 19, Sutton pitched for the 1964 Packers in the collegiate amateur Basin League, helping Sioux Falls to the league title.

In their first season of play in the league, the Sioux Falls Packers won the 1964 league Basin League championship, with Baseball Hall of Fame pitcher Don Sutton on their roster at age 19. The Packers finished third in the regular season standings and qualified for the four-team playoffs. In the finals Clyde Wright pitched a four-hitter in the clinching game as Sioux Falls defeated the Valentine Hearts 3-2 to win the league title. Wright struck out the side in the 9th inning to end the final game.

Pitching for Sioux Falls, after playing collegiately in the spring season for Gulf Coast Community College, Don Sutton had a 5-5 record with 118 strikeouts in 90 innings pitching for the Packers. Following his successful season with the Packers in which he was named 1st team All-league, Sutton was signed by the Los Angeles Dodgers with a $15,000 bonus, having been scouted during the summer by Dodger scouts Leon Hamilton, Monty Basgall, and Burt Wells after turning down higher bonus offers from other teams. In 1966, Don Sutton was in the major leagues, pitching in the Dodgers' starting rotation alongside fellow Hall of Fame members Sandy Koufax and Don Drysdale.

The Packers continued Basin League play in 1965 as the defending champions and finished the season in last place. On June 10, 1965, in the season opener, the Pierre Cowboys defeated the Sioux Falls Packers 14-1 at Pierre.

On August 3, 1965, pitcher Scott Morton of the Pierre Cowboys pitched a 24-inning complete game against Sioux Falls. Morton struck out 26 Sioux Falls hitters. In the game that lasted over 6 hours in duration, Pierre and Morton defeated the Packers 5-3 at Sioux Falls Stadium. Ironically, in the 1964 season, Morton had pitched a 19-inning complete game in a loss to Sioux Falls.

The 1965 Packers finished in sixth place in the six-team Basin League after winning the championship the year prior.

=== 1966: Rejoin Northern League ===
Owned by a group of Sioux Falls businessmen in 1966, the Sioux Falls Packers left the Basin League and resumed minor league play, rejoining the Northern League, which expanded. Sioux Falls continued play at the upgraded Sioux Falls Stadium with financial help from numerous local businessmen, including Isadore Pitts and Ray Syverson, who each donated $100,000. Becoming a Cincinnati Reds minor league affiliate team, Sioux Falls joined the six-team, Class A level (equivalent of the former Class D level leagues) Northern League. The league expanded, from a four-team league, with the league adding Sioux Falls and a Bismarck, North Dakota based team.

In the newly expanded league, the Packers and the Bismarck-Mandan Pards (Houston Astros minor league affiliate) joined the returning Aberdeen Pheasants (Baltimore Orioles affiliate), Duluth-Superior Dukes (Chicago Cubs), Huron Phillies (Philadelphia Phillies), and St. Cloud Rox (Minnesota Twins) teams in the league. The Northern League played a short season schedule, with the league games beginning on June 26, 1966.

On August 26, 1966, the Packers played the Bismarck-Mandan Pards and a pitcher's duel resulted in a total of 37 strikeouts in their 9-inning efforts between the two pitchers. With 133 fans in attendance at Bismarck, Sioux Falls pitcher Gary Nolan and Scipio Spinks of the Pards faced off. Spinks set a record in the Northern League by striking out 20 Sioux Falls batters in the game, while Nolan tallied 17. With both pitchers removed after 9-innings, Bismarck scored a run in the bottom of the 10th inning to win the game 1-0.

Jim Snyder began a four-season tenure as the Sioux Falls manager in 1966 as the Canaries finished with a 26–41 record. Their record placed Sioux Falls in fifth place, finishing 23.0 games behind the first place St. Cloud Rox in the final standings. No league playoffs were held with the short season schedule in the Northern League. Sioux Falls would remain in the league as a Cincinnati Reds affiliate through the 1971 season.

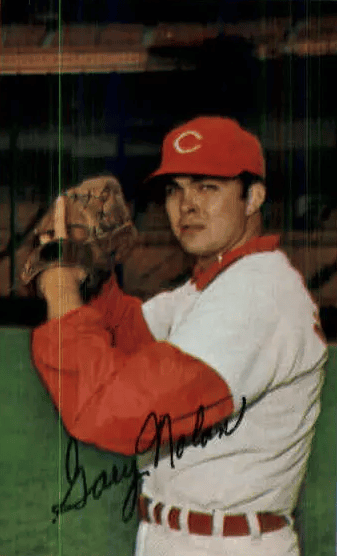
(1971) Gary Nolan, Cincinnati Reds. Nolan had a 7-3 record with a 1.82 ERA for Sioux Falls in 1966 and struck out 17 in one game.

Jim Snyder was a former minor league infielder who began his managerial career with Sioux Falls in 1966. Following his tenure with the Packers, he became manager of the 1976 Indianapolis Indians and later managed the Triple-A with the Oklahoma City 89ers. He became a major league coach with the Chicago Cubs in 1987. He then joined the Seattle Mariners' 1988 staff as first-base coach under Hall of Fame manager Dick Williams. On June 6, 1988, Williams was fired, with the Mariners at 23–33. Snyder was promoted to manage Seattle for the remainder of the 1988 season. Jim Lefebvre was hired as the Seattle manager in 1989 replacing Snyder.

Future major league All-star Gary Nolan pitched for the Packers just out of high school in 1966. Nolan graduated from California's Oroville High School and was drafted by the Cincinnati Reds in the first round with the 13th pick of the 1966 Major League Baseball draft. Nolan had a 7-3 record with a 1.82 ERA in 12 games with 9 complete games for Sioux Falls. He had 163 strikeouts in 104 innings. Following his strong showing with the Packers, Nolan made his major league debut with Cincinnati in April 1967 and had a 14 win season as a 19 year old rookie. In his major league career with the Cincinnati Reds (1967–1977) and California Angels (1977), Nolan compiled a record of 110–70 with a 3.08 ERA, Nolan's pitching career ended at age 29 due to recurring elbow issues. Nolan is the namesake of the Gary Nolan Baseball Complex in Oroville, California.

=== 1967 to 1970: Northern League ===
Clarence Burnell Erickson served as president of the Sioux Falls Packers. Continuing play in the 1967 Northern League, the Packers finished with a record of 35–33. Managed by the returning Jim Snyder, their record saw Sioux Falls end the season in third place. The Packers ended the season 8.0 games behind the first place St. Cloud Rox and 1.0 game behind the second place Mankato Mets. Sioux Falls pitcher Steve Blateric led the Northern League with 118 strikeouts.

Catcher Fred Kendall began his professional career with Sioux Falls in 1967 at age 18. Kendall batted .301 with 2 home runs and 31 RBIS in 62 games for the Packers. Kendall went on to a lengthy major league career, playing with the expansion team and remaining with the San Diego Padres for eight seasons (1969–1976), followed by stints with the Cleveland Indians (1977), Boston Red Sox (1978) and a return to the San Diego Padres (1979–1980). In his major league career, Kendall batted .234 with 31 home runs.

At age 18, pitcher Wayne Simpson played for Sioux Falls in 1967, after being the 8th overall pick in the first round of the 1967 Major League Baseball draft after graduating from high school in Compton, California. Simpson pitched in 12 games for Sioux Falls, compiling a 4–3 record with a 2.84 ERA. Simpson became an All-star in pitching in the major leagues with the Cincinnati Reds (1970–1972), Kansas City Royals (1973), Philadelphia Phillies (1975) and California Angels (1977). In his rookie season, after being selected for the 1970 Major League Baseball All-Star Game at age 21, Simpson tore his rotator cuff on July 31, 1970. After the injury, he continued to try and pitch but was only able to appear in two games and ended the season with a 14–3 record. Simpson's injury predated the advancements in rotator cuff surgery. Simpson later pitched his final professional season in 1979 for the Tigres Capitalinos in the Mexican League and there he developed thoracic outlet syndrome, a diagnosis which threatened the loss of his arm and possibly his life. But, Simpson recovered after several surgeries.

Remaining a Cincinnati Reds affiliate in 1968, the Packers ended the Northern League season in third place. With a record of 41–29, playing under Jim Snyder, Sioux Falls ended the season 2.0 games behind the champion St. Cloud Rox and 1.5 games behind the second place Mankato Mets in a close race in the six-team Class A level league.

Remaining as a Cincinnati Reds affiliate, the Packers ended the season as the runner up in the 1969 Class A level Northern League. Sioux Falls placed second place in the six-team league, with a record of 42–25. Jim Snyder returned as manager and the Packers ended the season 1.5 games behind the champion Duluth-Superior Dukes. Sioux Falls Packers players Kent Burdick and Thomas Dittmar both hit 10 home runs on the season to tie for the lead in the Northern League.

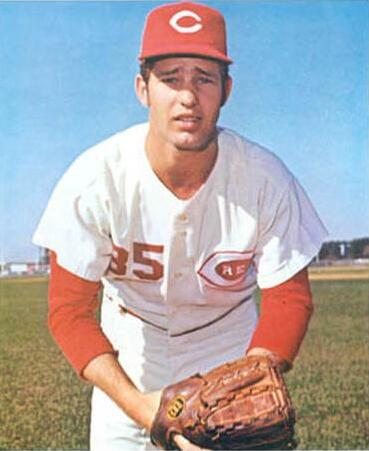
(1972) Don Gullett, Cincinnati Reds. With the Packers in 1969, Gullett had a 7-2 record and a 1.96 ERA in his only minor league season.

Left-handed pitcher Don Gullett pitched for the Packers in 1969 after being selected in the first round of the 1969 Major League Baseball draft. His season with the Packers proved to be his only minor league season. With Sioux Falls, Gullett had a record of 7-2 with a 1.96 ERA. Gullett debuted with the Cincinnati Reds in 1970. Gullett was a member of six World Series teams in 1970, 1972, 1975, 1976, 1977, and 1978 and won four consecutive World Series championships with the 1975 and 1976 Cincinnati Reds, and the 1977 and 1978 New York Yankees. Gullett had a career major league record of 109-50 pitching for the Cincinnati Reds (1970–1976) and New York Yankees (1977–1978). Shoulder injuries and a torn rotator cuff ended his pitching career at age 27. Gullett then became the long-time pitching coach for the Cincinnati Reds.

Another left-handed pitcher, Ross Grimsley pitched for Sioux Falls in 1969, joining Gullett on the staff. Grimsley ended his first professional season with a record of 9–4 with a 2.81 ERA pitching for the Packers. Grimsley went on to a lengthy major league career and had a major league record of 124–99 record with a 3.89 ERA and 79 complete games, Grimsley was an All-star in his career and pitched for the Cincinnati Reds (1971–1873), Baltimore Orioles (1974–1977 and 1982), Montreal Expos (1978–80), Cleveland Indians (1980).

Ater the 1969 season, Jim Snyder remained in the Cincinnati Reds organization and was promoted to become the manager of the Class AA Asheville Tourists in the Southern League.

Replacing Snyder, former major league catcher Russ Nixon became the Sioux Falls manager in 1970, his first managerial position following the conclusion of his playing career. Nixon had concluded his career as a player with the 1968 Boston Red Sox. Nixon had been cut by the Chicago White Sox during spring training in 1969 and had ended his playing career. In twelve major league seasons playing with the Cleveland Indians (1957–1960), Boston Red Sox (1960–1965), Minnesota Twins (1966–1967) and Boston Red Sox (1968), Nixon batted .268 with 27 career home runs. Nixon's season with Sioux Falls began a 36 year run of serving as a coach or manager at virtually every level of professional baseball. On February 4, 1970 the Cincinnati Reds hired Nixon to be a minor league catching instructor with the intent to coach with Asheville Tourists and then take over in June when the short-season Northern League's Sioux Falls Packers began play.

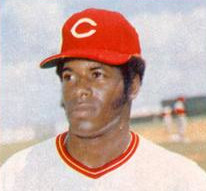
(1977) Ken Griffey Sr., Cincinnati Reds. Griffey played the 1970 season with Sioux Falls at age 20, .

Ken Griffey Sr. played for the Packers in 1970 in his second professional season at age 20, batting .244 with 2 home runs while appearing in 51 games for Sioux Falls. After first living in a dorm at Augustana University, Griffey and his wife Bertie rented an apartment on Spring Avenue with their son Ken Griffey, Jr. being less than one year old in the household. Griffey went on to a storied major league career winning two World Series championships and becoming an All-star player. Griffey Sr. played with the Cincinnati Reds (1973–1981), New York Yankees (1982–1986), Atlanta Braves (1986–1988), Cincinnati Reds (1988–1990) and Seattle Mariners (1990–1991). A three-time major league All-star, Griffey Sr. retired with a career batting average of .296 with 2,143 total hits, 152 home runs and 859 RBIs. With the Seattle Mariners he famously played two seasons alongside his son, Baseball Hall of Fame player Ken Griffey Jr. during his son's first two major league seasons.

On July 29, 1970, the Canaries committed four errors in the 9th inning to lose a game. Sioux Falls had a 3–1 lead against the St. Cloud Rox in the 9th inning and gave up 6 runs after the errors. The Canaries lost the game 7–3 at home with 402 fans in attendance.

The Northern League played as a four-team league in 1970 after the defending champion Duluth-Superior Dukes and Huron Cubs teams folded and did not return to play. The 1970 Packers struggled in the six-team Class A league season, as Sioux Falls finished in last place with a record of 24–46 playing under Russ Nixon. The Sioux Falls Packers finished 24.5 games behind the Duluth-Superior Dukes and 7.0 games behind fifth place St. Cloud Rox in the final standings, as the league held no playoffs.

Following his 1970 season with Sioux Falls, Russ Nixon began a five-season tenure as the manager of the Class A level Tampa Tarpons, also a Cincinnati Reds affiliate. Nixon then became a coach with the 1976 World Series champion Reds. After coaching with the Reds, he became the Cincinnati Reds manager in 1982 and 1983. After next serving as a coach with the Montreal Expos and Atlanta Braves, Nixon became the manager of the Braves. He managed the Braves from 1988 to 1990 and was replaced by his general manager Bobby Cox during the 1990 season. Nixon remained in roles a major league coach and minor league manager. At age 70 he managed the 2005 Greeneville Astros, of the Appalachian League, an affiliate of the Houston Astros, leading the team to a third place finish. In 2008, Nixon began serving as a roving instructor for the Texas Rangers, appointed by the Rangers' club president at the time, Nolan Ryan. Nixon served in the role through 2011.

Will McEnaney pitched for Sioux Falls in 1970. McEnaney had a record of 3–10, with a 5.17 ERA. His 10 losses on the season were the most losses in the league. McEnaney went on to a major league career and he pitched 262 games in the majors with the Cincinnati Reds (1974–1976), Montreal Expos (1977), Pittsburgh Pirates (1978) and St. Louis Cardinals (1979). In the 1975 World Series, McEnaney pitched in five games and had 6 2/3 innings in relief with a 2.70 ERA and one save. He earned the save in the seventh and final game, closing out the World Series with a perfect three-out ninth inning to close out the Series victory for Cincinnati. In the 1976 World Series, McEnaney pitched 4 2/3 scoreless innings in two games, earning two saves. McEnaney again closed out the World Series with a perfect 9th inning, as the Reds completed a four-game sweep over the New York Yankees. His closing prowess in the post season made McEneaney a World Series winner twice with the Cincinnati Reds.

Drafted out of high school, Pat Zachry pitched for Sioux Falls in 1970, his first professional season. Zachry had a 2-1 record with a 3.43 ERA pitching for the Packers at age 18. Zachry became the NL Rookie of the Year in 1976, compiling a 14–6 record with the World Series champion Reds and he later became an All-star. Zachry pitched in the major leagues with the Cincinnati Reds (1976–1977), New York Mets (1977–1982), Los Angeles Dodgers (1983–1984) and Philadelphia Phillies (1985) and compiled a 69–67 record with a 3.52 ERA. Arm injuries ended Zachry's pitching career.

Outfielder Joel Youngblood played for Sioux Falls in 1970 at age 18. A future major league all-star, Youngblood batted .225 with 0 home runs appearing in 64 games. Played in the major leagues with the Cincinnati Reds (1976), St. Louis Cardinals (1977), New York Mets (1977–1982), Montreal Expos (1982), San Francisco Giants (1983–1988) and Cincinnati Reds (1989). In 1408 career games over 14 seasons, Youngblood batted .265 with 80 home runs, 422 RBIs and 60 stolen bases. Youngblood played at every position except pitcher in his major league career. Youngblood delivered a rare feat in his career. On August 4, 1982, Youngblood was traded from the New York Mets to the Montreal Expos. He was traded after having played a day game for New York in Chicago against the Chicago Cubs. He traveled immediately to Philadelphia where Montreal was playing a night game, and he arrived at the ballpark during the game. Youngblood was called upon to pinch hit for Montreal and he delivered a single against Hall of Fame pitcher Steve Carlton. Having gotten a hit in the day game for New York earlier in the day, Youngblood became the first and only major league player to collect hits for different teams in the same day.

=== 1971: Final Northern League season ===
Continuing play at Sioux Falls Stadium, the Packers played their final Class A Northern League season in 1971, as the league itself folded following the season.

Former minor league catcher Dave Pavlesic became the Sioux Falls manager for the 1971 season. Pavlesic had been the manager of the Billings Mustangs in the Pioneer League in 1970. At age 33, the 1971 season was his final season in professional baseball. Pavlesic authored a book titled I Was Born to Play Baseball that chronicles his career.

In the final season in their first tenure of Northern league play in 1971, the league became a four-team league, beginning play on June 23, 1971. The Duluth-Superior Dukes and Huron Cubs teams did not return to the 1971 league. Remaining as a Cincinnati Reds affiliate, the Packers ended the season with a record of 34–37, playing under manager Dave Pavlesic. Sioux Falls ended the season in third place, finishing 8.5 games behind the first place St. Cloud Rox and 1.0 game behind the second place Aberdeen Pheasants. Sioux Falls pitcher Ken Hansen led the league with a both a 1.76 ERA and 135 strikeouts, appearing in 24 games and 87 innings playing at age 22. Hansen also walked 71 batters. Hansen had been drafted by the Reds that summer out of Arizona State University.

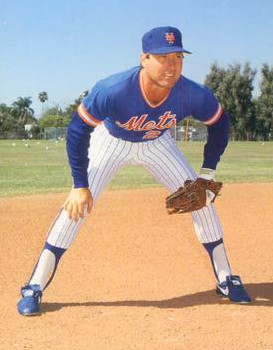
(1986) Ray Knight, New York Mets. Knight was the Most Valuable Player of the 1986 World Series. He played for Sioux Falls in his first professional season in 1971.

Third baseman Ray Knight played for the Packers in their final season. In his first professional season at age 18, Knight batted .285 with 6 home runs and 36 RBIs in 64 games. Knight became a two-time all-star playing 13 major league seasons with the Cincinnati Reds (1974–1981), Houston Astros (1982–1984), New York Mets (1984–1986), Baltimore Orioles (1987) and Detroit Tigers (1988). Knight is known for scoring the winning run in game 6 of the 1986 World Series and was the World Series Most Valuable player. Knight later managed the Cincinnati Reds from 1996 to 1997 and 2003.

Pitcher Joaquín Andújar played for the Packers in 1971. Andújar gave little indication of his future successes, having 6.36 ERA in 19 games for Sioux Falls. Andújar became a four-time major league all-star pitching for the Houston Astros (1976–1981), St. Louis Cardinals (1981–1985), Oakland Athletics (1986–1987) and Houston Astros (1988). He had a career record of 127–118 with a 3.58 ERA and won a Gold Glove Award. Andújar was known throughout his career as a highly competitive and outgoing pitcher.

After the conclusion of the 1971 season, the Class A level Northern League folded. With no league in the region, Sioux Falls did not host minor league baseball for another 22 years.

Minor league baseball resumed in Sioux Falls in 1993, when the Sioux Falls Canaries were formed. The new Canaries began play as charter members of the reformed independent Northern League. The 1993 team adopted the Canaries nickname paying homage to the longtime teams based in the city. Today, the Sioux Falls Canaries continue play as members of the American Association of Professional Baseball, playing home games at the historic Sioux Falls Stadium.

== The ballparks ==
Sioux Falls minor league teams played at three different ballparks in the decades from 1902 to 1971. One ballpark has been home to teams since 1941.

In their first two seasons, the 1902 and 1903 Canaries teams played home games in Sioux Falls at a ballfield called The Oval.

In 1920, Sioux Falls teams began hosting minor league home games at Nelson Field. The ballpark was located within the Nelson Park parcel at 11th Street & Cliff Street in Sioux Falls. During the 1920 season, the ballpark grandstand was hit by a tornado and carried onto the nearby street. Today, Nelson Park is still in use as a public park with amenities located at 200 South Fairfax Avenue.

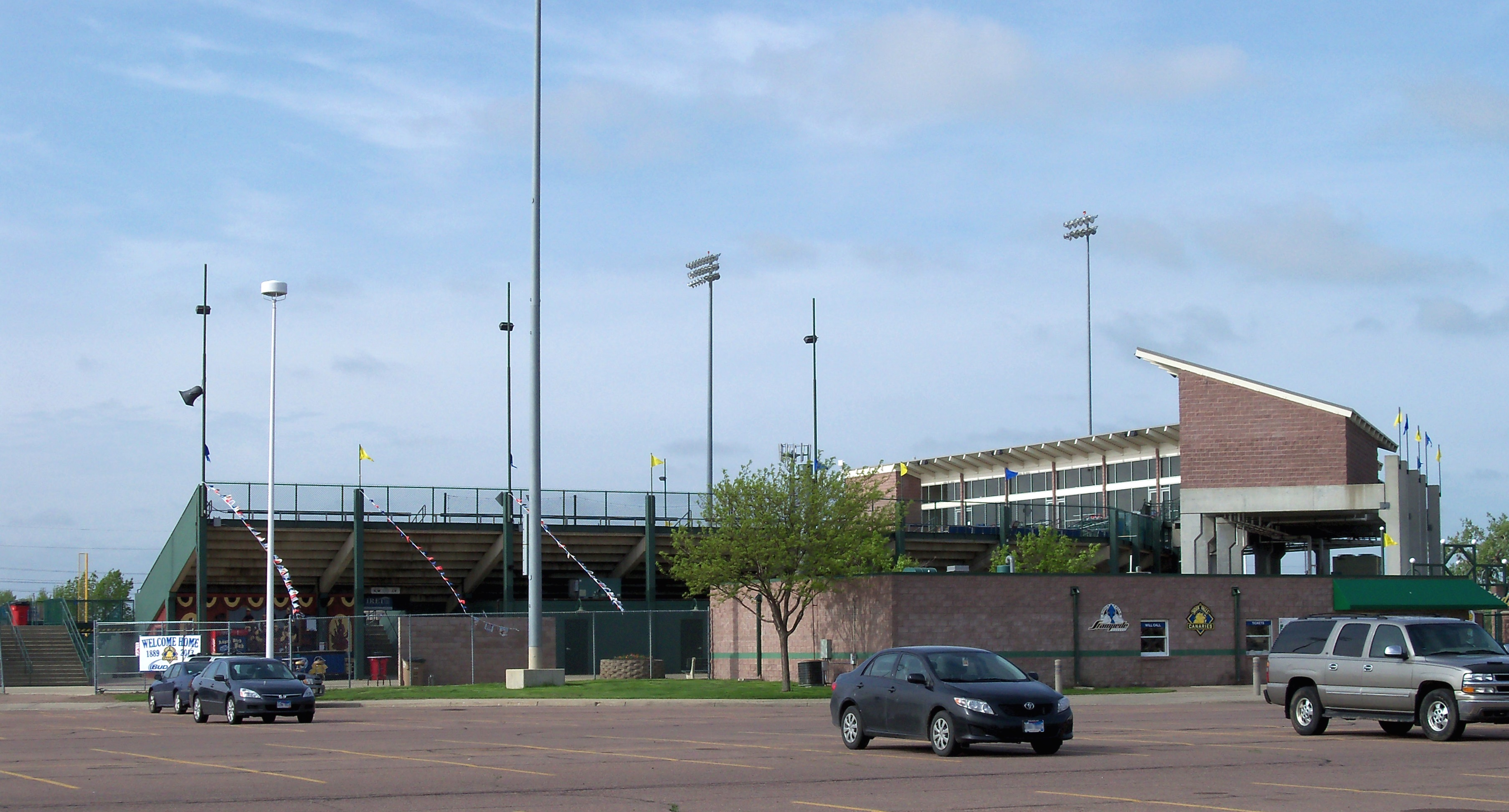
(2013) Sioux Falls Stadium, Sioux Falls, South Dakota.

In 1941, Sioux Falls began hosting home games in a newly built Sioux Falls Stadium that was built to attract minor league affiliate baseball to the city. Sioux Falls Stadium was built in 1941. It was first remodeled in 1964 as the Sioux Falls Packers resumed play. The ballpark was remodeled again in 2000 receiving a 5.6-million-dollar upgrade.

During the six-season run of the Sioux Falls Packers, the ballpark was nicknamed Packers Stadium.

In his final professional season as a player Hall of Fame pitcher Dizzy Dean pitched for Sioux Falls in front of a crowd of 3,000 at the new ballpark in July 1941.

Spurred in 1961 by the Minnesota Twins expressing a desire to place a team in Sioux Falls if a more suitable ballpark was constructed, the stadium was totally redesigned with blueprints completed and construction started in 1963. Working summer jobs as teenagers while playing for the amateur team, Sioux Falls Packers' pitchers Hall of Famer Don Sutton and Clyde Wright were credited with building the new pitcher's mound on the new field. On June 18, 1964, the new ballpark hosted its first game. The grandstands were totally completed in 1965,

Today, Sioux Falls Stadium is still in use and has been remodeled continuing to serve as home to the Sioux Falls Canaries beginning in 1993. and in 2017 gaining the collegiate Sioux Falls Cougars as a host. Today, the ballpark has been nicknamed as "The Birdcage." The ballpark is located at 1001 NW Avenue Service Road in Sioux Falls.

== Timeline ==
Year(s)	# Yrs.	Team	Level	League	Ballpark	Affiliate
1902–1903	2	Sioux Falls Canaries	Class D	Iowa–South Dakota League	The Oval	None
1920–1923	4	Sioux Falls Soos	Class D	South Dakota League	Nelson Field	None
1924	1	Sioux Falls Canaries	Class D	Tri-State League	Nelson Field	None
1933–1938	6	Sioux Falls Canaries	Class D	Nebraska State League	Nelson Field	None
1939	1	Sioux Falls Canaries	Class D	Western League	Nelson Field	Chicago Cubs
1940	1	Sioux Falls Canaries	Class D	Western League	Nelson Field	None
1941	1	Sioux Falls Canaries	Class D	Western League	Sioux Falls Stadium	None
1942, 1946	2	Sioux Falls Canaries	Class C	Northern League	Sioux Falls Stadium	None
1947–1953	7	Sioux Falls Canaries	Class C	Northern League	Sioux Falls Stadium	Chicago Cubs
1966–1971	6	Sioux Falls Packers	Class A	Northern League	Sioux Falls Stadium	Cincinnati Reds

== Year-by-year records ==
Year	Record	Finish	Manager	Playoffs / Notes
1902	65-24	1st	Bobby Warner	No playoff held League champions
1903	40-42	4th	Bobby Warner	No playoff held
1920	58-40	2nd	Fred Carisch	No playoffs held
1921	61-35	2nd	Fred Carisch	No playoffs held
1922	55-42	4th	Fred Carisch	No playoffs held
1923	35-22	1st	Jack Beatty	League disbanded July 17; League champions
1924	35-30	1st (t)	Frank Boyle	League disbanded July 17; Co-League Champions
1933	57-49	3rd	Rex Stucker	No playoffs held
1934	50-60	3rd	Rex Stucker	No playoffs held
1935	72-40	1st	Ralph Brandon	Won league pennant Lost League Finals
1936	71-49	1st	Ralph Brandon	Won league pennant Lost League Finals
1937	83-36	1st	Ralph Brandon	No playoffs held League champions
1938	49-68	6th	Ralph Brandon	Did not qualify
1939	66-52	2nd	Ralph Brandon	Lost in 1st round
1940	59-58	2nd	Bob Fenner	League champions
1941	51-56	5th	Bob Fenner / Tony Koenig	Did not qualify
1942	57-60	4th	Joe Bosse	Lost league finals
1946	41-68	7th	Lynn King	Did not qualify
1947	75-43	2nd	Jim Oglesby	League champions
1948	45-75	7th	Jim Oglesby	Did not qualify
1949	58-67	6th	Irvin Fortune / Lee Eilbracht	Did not qualify
1950	70-55	3rd	Lee Eilbracht	League champions
1951	46-75	8th	Lee Eilbracht / Richard Lloyd	Did not qualify
1952	73-48	2nd	Al Kubski	Lost league finals
1953	59-65	5th	Dale Lynch	Did not qualify
1966	26-41	5th	Jim Snyder	No playoffs held
1967	35-33	3rd	Jim Snyder	No playoffs held
1968	41-29	3rd	Jim Snyder	No playoffs held
1969	42-25	2nd	Jim Snyder	No playoffs held
1970	24-46	6th	Russ Nixon	No playoffs held
1971	34-37	4th	Dave Pavlesic	No playoffs held

== Notable alumni ==
- Dizzy Dean (1941) Inducted Baseball Hall of Fame, 1953
- Don Sutton (1964) Inducted Baseball Hall of Fame, 1998
- Santo Alcalá (1971)
- Red Anderson (1936–1937, 1946)
- Joaquín Andújar (1971)
- Mel Behney (1968)
- Hi Bell (1922)
- Steve Blateric (1967)
- Harry Bright (1950)
- Fred Carisch (1902; 1920–1922, MGR)
- Tom Carroll (1970)
- Darrell Chaney (1966)
- Frank Cleve (1924)
- Nardi Contreras (1969, 1971)
- Phil Cooney (1913–1917, 1920)
- Arturo DeFreites (1971)
- Lee Eilbracht (1949–1951, MGR)
- Don Elston (1951–1952) 2x MLB All-star
- Sammy Gee (1948, 1953)
- Danny Godby (1968)
- Ken Griffey Sr. (1970) Cincinnati Reds Hall of Fame
- Ross Grimsley (1969) MLB All-star
- Don Gullett (1969) Cincinnati Reds Hall of Fame
- Oris Hockett (1933, 1935) MLB All-Star
- Ross Horning (1941–1942, 1946–1947)
- Art Jahn (1922)
- Mike Johnson (1969)
- Fred Kendall (1967)
- Lynn King (1933; 1946, MGR)
- Ray Knight (1971) 2x MLB All-star
- Gene Locklear (1969–1970)
- Willie Ludolph (1921–1923)
- Bobby Marcano (1969)
- Ronny Miller (1941)
- Will McEnaney (1970)
- Frank Naleway (1920-1922)
- Gary Nolan (1966) Cincinnati Reds Hall of Fame
- Chuck Orsborn (1941)
- John Rennicke (1935
- Greg Riddoch (1969)
- Wayne Simpson (1967) MLB All-star
- Lou Sleater (1948)
- Bob Speake (1949)
- Jim Snyder (1966–1969, MGR)
- George Stueland (1920-1921)
- Dick Triptow (1947)
- Rube Walker (1950)
- Biggs Wehde (1942)
- Clyde Williams (1902–1903)
- Casey Wise (1953)
- Roger Wolff (1937)
- Clyde Wright (1964) MLB All-star
- Joel Youngblood (1970)
- Pat Zachry (1970) 1976 NL Rookie of the Year
- Jack Zalusky (1902)

== See also ==
- Sioux Falls Canaries players
- Sioux Falls Packers players
- Sioux Falls Soos players
- Sioux Falls Canaries managers
