= Lee Eilbracht =

American baseball coach and player

Eilbracht

Lee Paul Eilbracht (March 22, 1924 – January 2, 2013) was an American college baseball coach and player in the Chicago Cubs organization.

== Biography ==
Born in St. Louis, Missouri, Eilbracht was raised in Waterloo, Illinois.

Eilbracht is the winningest coach in Illinois Fighting Illini baseball history and earned All-America honors as a collegiate player. Swami, as he was dubbed, posted a 518–395 record in 27 seasons at the helm from 1952 through 1978, winning four Big Ten Conference titles while leading his team to the NCAA District Playoffs three times.

As an Illini catcher, Eilbracht was a three-time letterwinner in 1943 and from 1946 to 1947. Moreover, he garnered Most Valuable Player in these last seasons and topped the Big Ten in hitting in 1946 with a .484 batting average. In between, he served in the Army during World War II before returning to the University of Illinois.

After graduation, Eilbracht pursued a professional career as a player and manager in the Chicago Cubs Minor League system from 1947 to 1952. Eilbracht hit .282 with 30 home runs in 391 games at three different levels. He was a player-manager of the Clinton Cubs for part of the 1948 season when they won the Central Association title, and then served as player-manager for the Sioux Falls Canaries from mid-1949 to mid-1951. He ended his playing career with the Danville Dans in 1952. Following the death of Illini head coach Wally Roettger in 1951, Eilbracht took charge of the team a year later.

Eilbracht served as an assistant coach for the United States team that played baseball at the 1964 Summer Olympics as a demonstration sport in Tokyo. He also served as the first executive director for the American Baseball Coaches Association, retiring after the 1978 season. He then worked as an analyst on Illini baseball broadcasts starting in the 1990s, and acted as a consultant for the Arizona Diamondbacks during several spring trainings. Additionally, he worked as an adviser and had a small part in the 1992 film A League of Their Own.

Eilbracht was a long-time resident of Savoy, Illinois, where he died in 2013 at the age of 88.
