= Red Anderson (baseball) =

American baseball player (1912-1972)

- Pitcher
- Born: June 19, 1912; Lawton, Iowa, U.S.
- Died: August 7, 1972 (aged 60); Sioux City, Iowa, U.S.
- Batted: Right Threw: Right

MLB debut
- September 19, 1937, for the Washington Senators

Last MLB appearance
- September 24, 1941, for the Washington Senators

MLB statistics
- Win–loss record: 5–8
- Earned run average: 4.35
- Strikeouts: 40
- Stats at Baseball Reference

Teams
- Washington Senators (1937, 1940–1941)

Arnold Revola "Red" Anderson (June 19, 1912 – August 7, 1972) was an American professional baseball player whose career spanned eight seasons, including three in Major League Baseball with the Washington Senators in 1937 and again from 1940 to 1941. Anderson, who was a pitcher, had a career major league record of 5–8 with a 4.35 earned run average (ERA), three complete games and 40 strikeouts in 36 games pitched, nine starts. Anderson also played in the minor leagues. From 1936 to 1942, Anderson played with the Class-D Sioux Falls Canaries, the Class-B Charlotte Hornets, the Class-A1 Chattanooga Lookouts and the Class-A Springfield Nationals. His baseball career was interrupted in 1943 after he entered service in the United States Navy during World War II. While in the navy, he attained the rank of Specialist (Physical Training Instructor) Petty officer second class. After the war, Anderson returned to baseball for a season in 1946 to play with the Class-C Aberdeen Pheasants and the Class-C Sioux Falls Canaries.

== Baseball career ==
Anderson began his professional baseball career in 1936 with the Class-D Sioux Falls Canaries of the Nebraska State League. That season, he went 9–7 in 23 games. In 1937, Anderson started his season with the Sioux Falls Canaries. During his time with Sioux Falls, Anderson pitched a record of 20–8 with a 2.96 earned run average (ERA) in 30 games pitched. Amongst pitchers in the Nebraska State League, Anderson was third in wins and fifth in ERA. That season, Anderson made his debut in Major League Baseball with the Washington Senators on September 19, against the Chicago White Sox going 3 2/3 innings, giving-up seven runs (all earned). With the Senators that season, Anderson pitched two games, going 0–1 with a 6.75 ERA. One of his games in the majors that season was a start, while the other was a relief appearance. In 1938, Anderson returned to the minor leagues, joining the Charlotte Hornets of the Class-B Piedmont League. That season, Anderson went 12–8 with a 5.03 ERA in 32 games pitched. Anderson joined the Class-B Springfield Nationals in 1939. With Springfield, Anderson went 12–15 with a 4.34 ERA in 31 games, 26 starts. In 1940, Anderson started the season with Springfield, going 12–13 with a 2.87 ERA in 32 games, 27 starts.

During September 1940, Anderson made his return to Major League Baseball, pitching two games with the Senators. He made his season debut on September 8, against the Philadelphia Athletics, giving-up four runs (all earned) in five innings pitched. On the season, Anderson went 1–1 with a 3.86 ERA, two complete games and three strikeouts in two games, both starts. Anderson spent the entire 1941 season with the Senators. His first start of the season was on April 16, against the Boston Red Sox, picking-us the loss. On June 29, in a game against the New York Yankees, Anderson gave-up the hit to Joe DiMaggio that broke George Sisler's American League 41-game hitting streak record. During the season, Anderson went 4–6 with a 4.18 ERA, one complete game and 32 strikeouts in 32 games, six starts. In 1942, Anderson returned to the minor league and spent the entire season with the Class-A! Chattanooga Lookouts of the Southern Association. That season, he went 2–3 with a 4.09 ERA in eight games, five starts.

== Military career ==
Anderson began his service in the United States Navy during World War II in 1942. He was in Pearl Harbor during his first year of service. Anderson completed his service in 1945. That year, he returned to baseball for one final season. He played with the Class-C Aberdeen Pheasants and the Sioux Falls Canaries of the Northern League and went 12–13 with a 3.63 ERA in 32 games pitched between the two teams.
