= Frank Cleve =

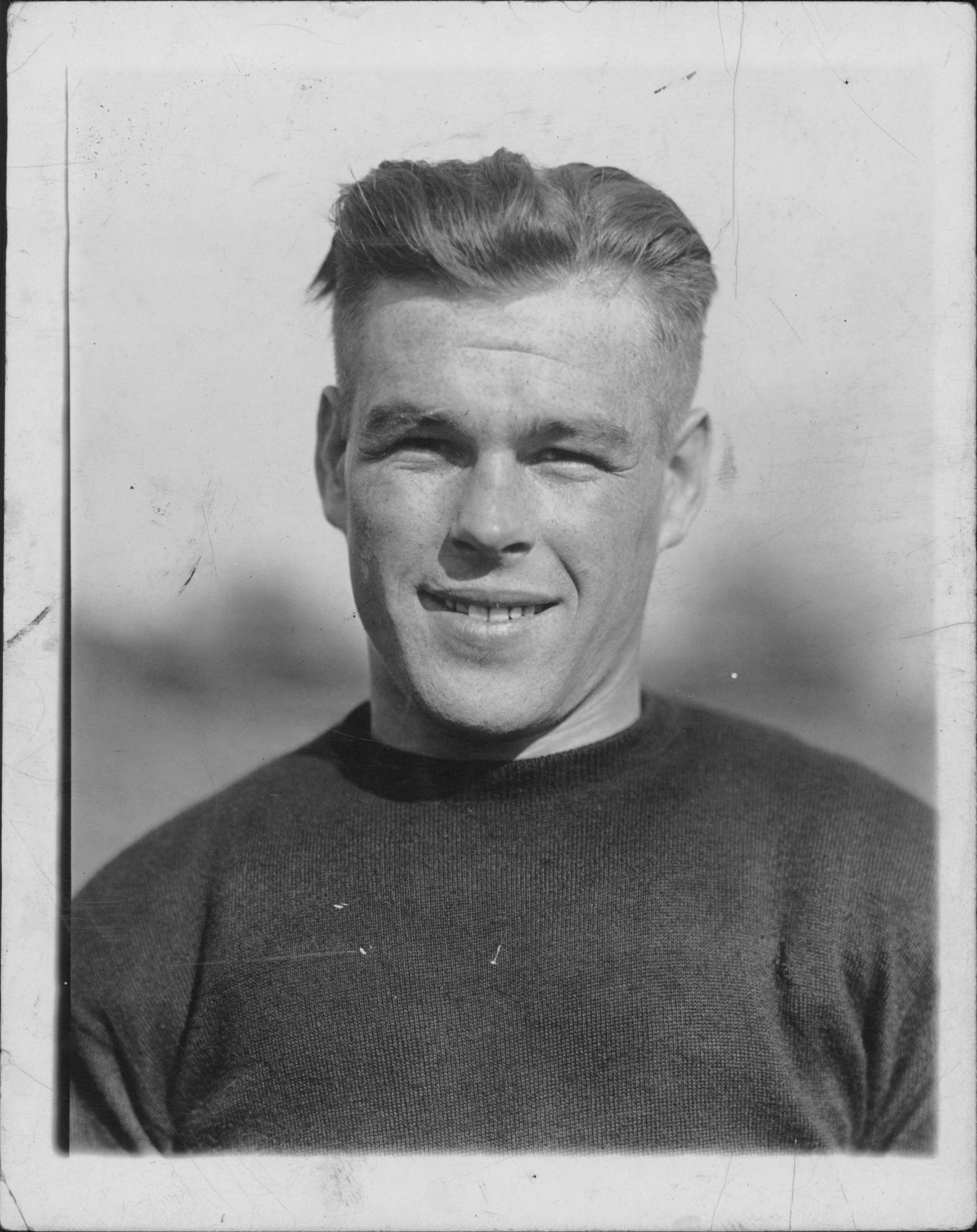

Biographical details
- Born: December 20, 1899; Minneapolis, Minnesota, U.S.
- Died: August 12, 1970 (aged 70); Edina, Minnesota, U.S.
- Education: St. Olaf (1925)

Playing career

Football
- 1921–1924: St. Olaf

Basketball
- 1921–1925: St. Olaf

Baseball
- 1921: Aberdeen Grays
- 1922–1924: St. Olaf
- 1922: Sioux Falls Soos
- 1923: Lincoln Links
- 1924: Sioux Falls Canaries
- 1933: Fargo–Moorhead Twins
- Positions: End (football); Forward (basketball); Second baseman, third baseman

Coaching career (HC unless noted)

Football
- 1925: Spokane College
- 1926–1935: Concordia
- 1936–1941: South HS (MN) (assistant)

Basketball
- 1925–1926: Spokane College
- 1927–1936: Concordia
- 1936–1942: South HS (MN)
- 1942–?: Camden HS (MN)

Baseball
- 1926: Spokane College
- 1928–1932: Concordia

Head coaching record
- Overall: 86–84 (college basketball); 5–11–1 (college baseball)

Accomplishments and honors

Championships
- Football; 2 MIAC (1931, 1934)

Frank Irving Cleve (December 20, 1899 – August 12, 1970) was an American football, basketball, and baseball coach and minor league baseball player. He served as the head football coach at Concordia College in Moorhead, Minnesota from 1926 to 1935, compiling a record of 30–30–13. Cleve was also the head basketball coach at Concordia from 1927 to 1936, tallying a mark of 86–84.

Cleve attended St. Olaf College in Northfield, Minnesota. In 1925, he was hired as athletic coach at Spokane College in Spokane, Washington, succeeding Abe Cohn.

His older brother, Ainer Cleve, played professional football in the early years of the National Football League.

Cleve died on August 12, 1970, at South Fairview Hospital in Edina, Minnesota, following an illness that began in January of that year.

== Head coaching record ==
=== College football ===
Year	Team	Overall	Conference	Standing	Bowl/playoffs
Spokane College Chieftains (Columbia Valley Conference) (1925)
1925	Spokane College		2–1	2nd	
Spokane College:			2–1		
Concordia Cobbers (Minnesota Intercollegiate Athletic Conference) (1926–1935)
1926	Concordia	0–7	0–4	7th	
1927	Concordia	4–2	2–2	4th	
1928	Concordia	3–1–2	2–1–2	3rd	
1929	Concordia	2–3–1	1–2–1	T–6th	
1930	Concordia	4–3–1	2–2	5th	
1931	Concordia	5–2–1	4–1	1st	
1932	Concordia	2–2–3	1–1–3	T–4th	
1933	Concordia	2–3–3	2–2–1	T–4th	
1934	Concordia	7–1–1	4–0	1st	
1935	Concordia	1–6–1	0–3–1	T–6th	
Concordia:		30–30–13	16–18–8		
Total:					
National championship Conference title Conference division title or championship game berth
