= Clinton Cubs =

The Clinton Cubs were a Minor League Baseball club that played from 1947 to 1948 in the Central Association. A Chicago Cubs affiliate team, they were based in Clinton, Iowa and played its home games at Riverview Stadium.

The Clinton squad prevailed during their short stint in the league, winning both the pennant title and the championship series in both seasons. They were renamed as the Clinton Steers for the 1949 season.

== Notable players ==
- Nelson Burbrink (catcher/manager)
- Lee Eilbracht (catcher/manager)
- Cal Howe (pitcher)
- Billy Klaus (third baseman/shortstop)

== Sources ==
- Johnson, Lloyd; Wolff, Miles (2007). The Encyclopedia of Minor League Baseball. Baseball America (Third edition). ISBN 978-1-93-239117-6
- Baseball Reference – Central Association (C) Encyclopedia and History
