= Sammy Gee =

American baseball player

- Shortstop
- Born: January 2, 1928; Detroit, Michigan, U.S.
- Died: June 28, 1969 (aged 41); Windsor, Ontario, Canada
- Batted: Right Threw: Right

Negro league baseball debut
- 1948, for the New York Cubans

Last appearance
- 1948, for the New York Cubans
- Stats at Baseball Reference

Teams
- New York Cubans (1948)

Samuel L. Gee (January 2, 1928 – June 28, 1969) was an American Negro league shortstop in the 1940s.

A native of Detroit, Michigan, Gee attended Sidney D. Miller Middle School where he was an all-state performer in basketball, as well as a standout in football and baseball. He played for the New York Cubans in 1948, and went on to play minor league baseball into the 1950s. Gee also played basketball for the Harlem Globetrotters. He died in Windsor, Ontario in 1969 at age 41.
