= Fred Carisch =

American baseball player (1881–1977)

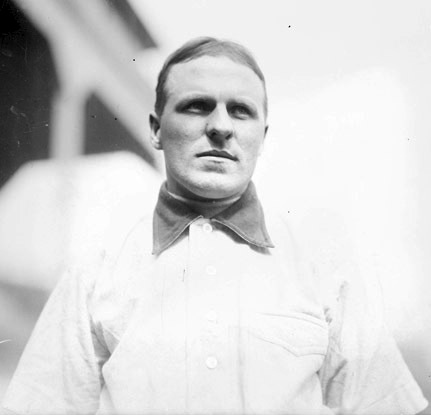
- Catcher
- Born: November 14, 1881; Fountain City, Wisconsin, U.S.
- Died: April 19, 1977 (aged 95); San Gabriel, California, U.S.
- Batted: Right Threw: Right

MLB debut
- August 31, 1903, for the Pittsburgh Pirates

Last MLB appearance
- July 4, 1923, for the Detroit Tigers

MLB statistics
- Batting average: .227
- Home runs: 1
- Runs batted in: 57
- Stats at Baseball Reference

Teams
- Pittsburgh Pirates (1903–1906); Cleveland Naps (1912–1914); Detroit Tigers (1923)

Frederick Behlmer Carisch (November 14, 1881 – April 19, 1977) was an American Major League Baseball (MLB) catcher who played for eight seasons. He played for the Pittsburgh Pirates from 1903 to 1906, the Cleveland Naps from 1912 to 1914, and the Detroit Tigers in 1923.

His one-off appearance for the Tigers occurred on July 4, 1923, against the Cleveland Indians. In the tenth inning, Larry Woodall, the only remaining catcher on the Tigers, was ejected from the game. When Indians manager Tris Speaker refused to let any of the other catchers reenter the game, Tigers manager Ty Cobb was forced to use 41-year-old Carisch, who was one of the Detroit coaches. Speaker had protested the game since Carisch was not on the eligible list, but the Indians won in the bottom of the inning.
