= 2008 Major League Baseball draft =

Baseball draft of amateur players

General information
- Date: June 5–6, 2008
- Network: ESPN

Overview
- 1504 total selections
- First selection: Tim Beckham; Tampa Bay Rays
- First round selections: 46

The 2008 Major League Baseball draft, was an annual choosing of high school and college baseball players, held on June 5 and 6, 2008.

== First round selections ==
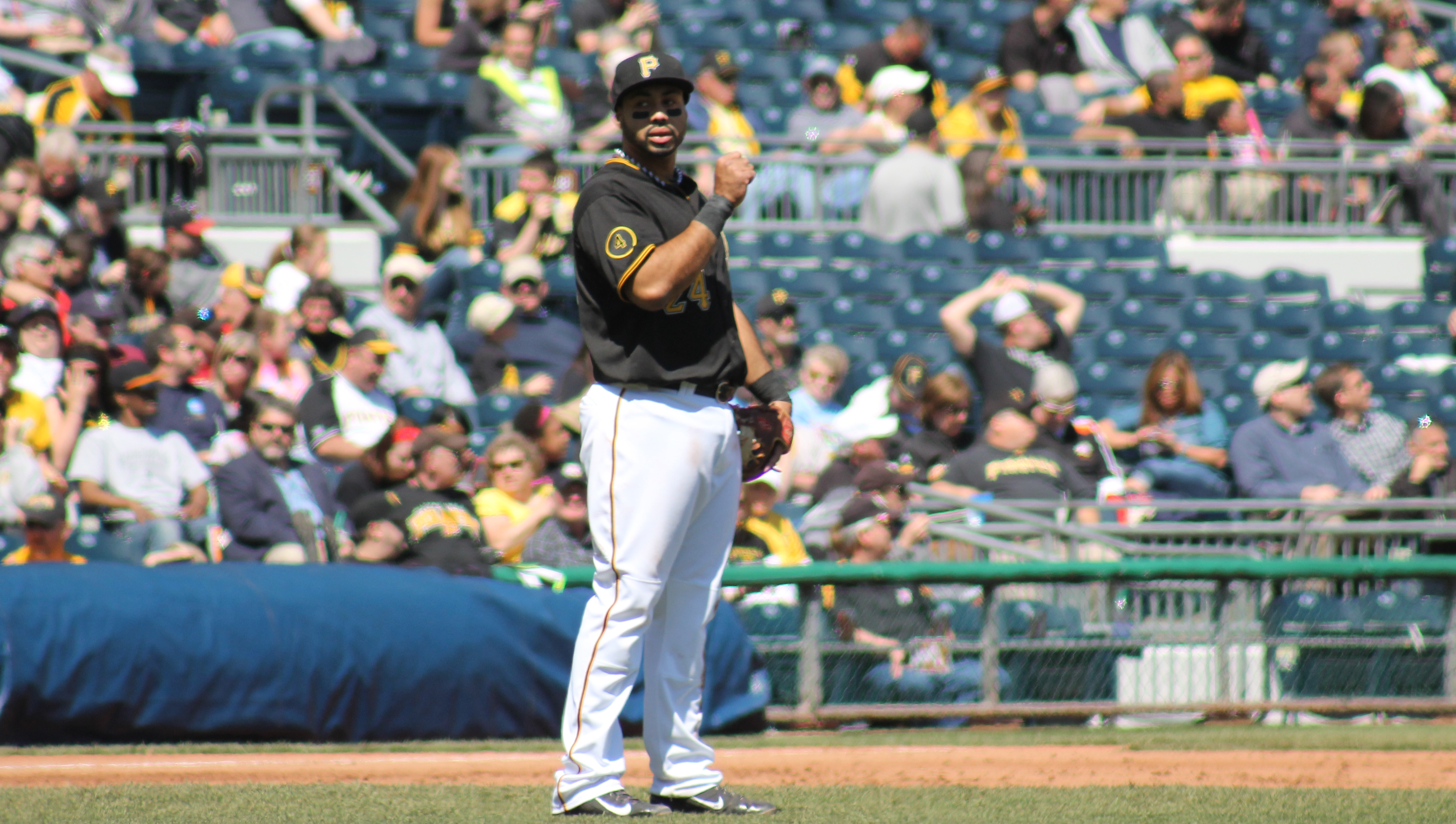
The Pittsburgh Pirates selected Pedro Álvarez second overall. Alvarez had a breakout season in 2013, where he was named an All-Star, was the National League home run leader, and won the Silver Slugger at third base.

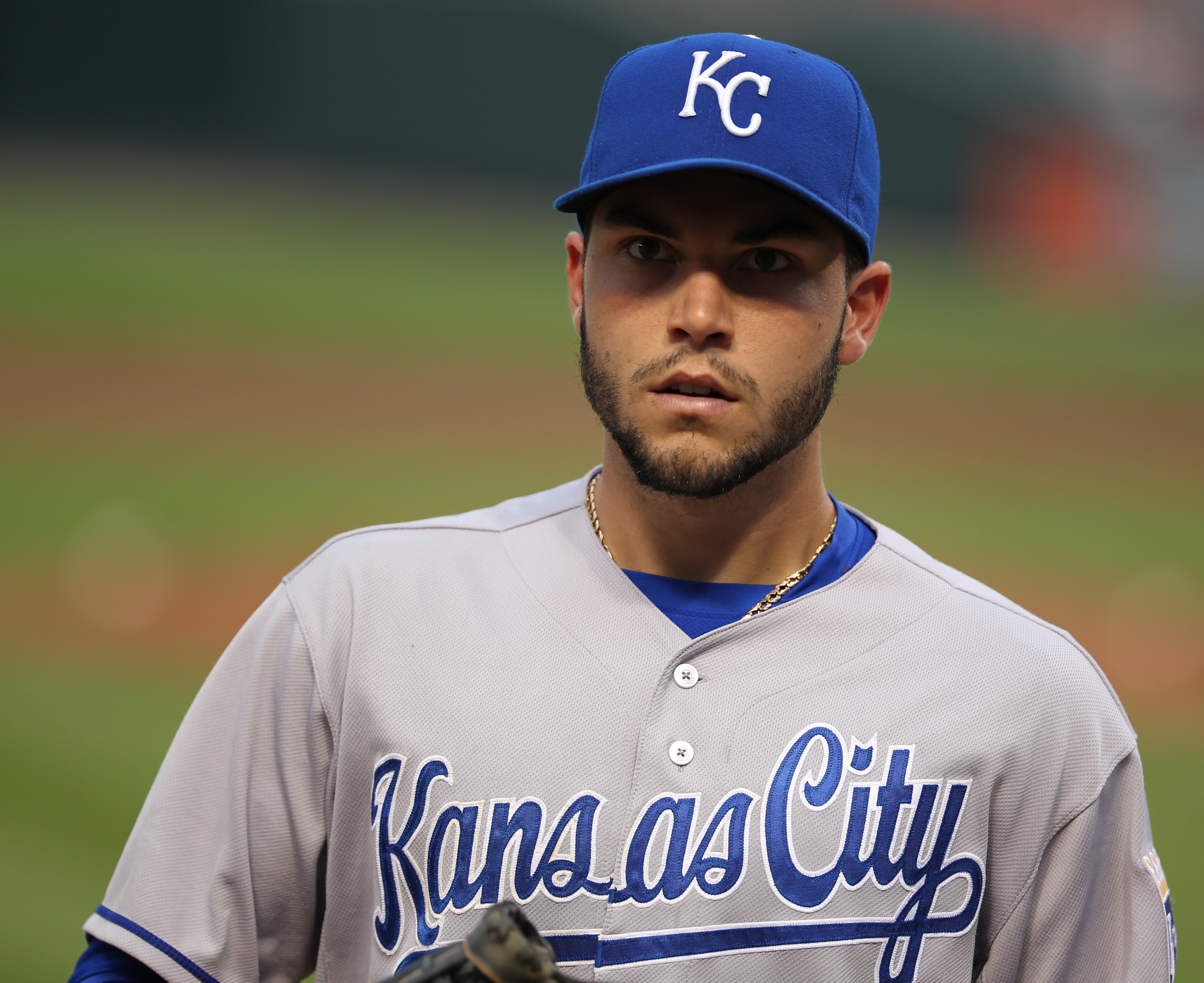
The Kansas City Royals selected Eric Hosmer with the third overall pick. With the Royals, Hosmer won 4 Gold Gloves at first base and the 2015 World Series.

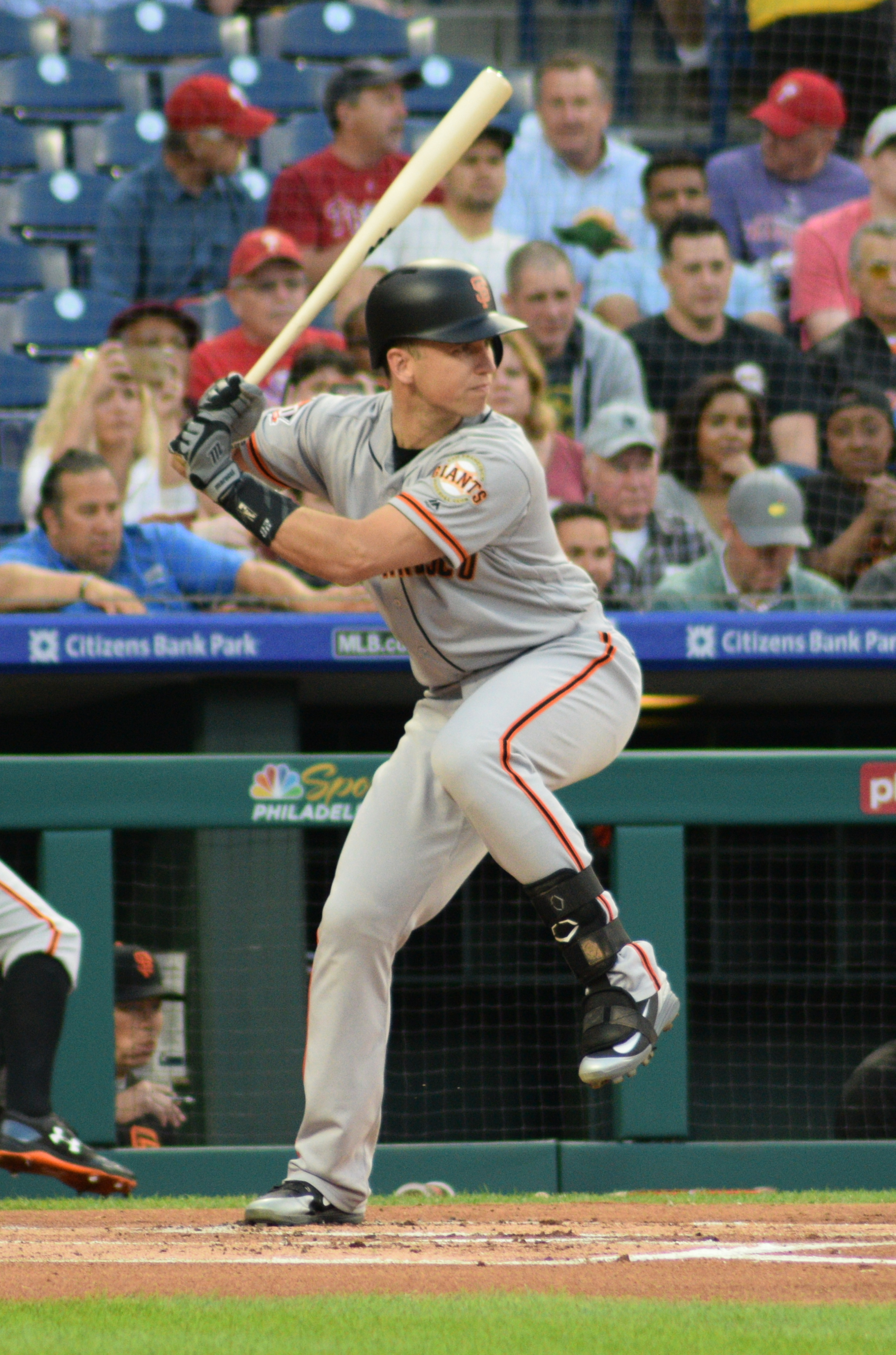
The San Francisco Giants selected Buster Posey 5th overall. The 7× All-Star won the 2010 Rookie of the Year Award, the 2012 N.L. Most Valuable Player Award, the 2016 Gold Glove Award at catcher, five Silver Sluggers Awards at catcher and the 2010, 2012, and 2014 World Series.

Key

	All-Star
*	Player did not sign

Pick	Player	Team	Position	School
1	Tim Beckham	Tampa Bay Rays	Shortstop	Griffin High School (GA)
2	Pedro Álvarez	Pittsburgh Pirates	Third baseman	Vanderbilt
3	Eric Hosmer	Kansas City Royals	First baseman	American Heritage School (FL)
4	Brian Matusz	Baltimore Orioles	Left-handed pitcher	San Diego
5	Buster Posey	San Francisco Giants	Catcher	Florida State
6	Kyle Skipworth	Florida Marlins	Catcher	Patriot High School (CA)
7	Yonder Alonso	Cincinnati Reds	First baseman	Miami (FL)
8	Gordon Beckham	Chicago White Sox	Shortstop	Georgia
9	Aaron Crow*	Washington Nationals	Right-handed pitcher	Missouri
10	Jason Castro	Houston Astros	Catcher	Stanford
11	Justin Smoak	Texas Rangers	First baseman	South Carolina
12	Jemile Weeks	Oakland Athletics	Second baseman	Miami (FL)
13	Brett Wallace	St. Louis Cardinals	Third baseman	Arizona State
14	Aaron Hicks	Minnesota Twins	Outfielder	Woodrow Wilson High School (CA)
15	Ethan Martin	Los Angeles Dodgers	Right-handed pitcher	Stephens County High School (GA)
16	Brett Lawrie	Milwaukee Brewers	Catcher	Brookswood Secondary School (BC)
17	David Cooper	Toronto Blue Jays	First baseman	California
18	Ike Davis	New York Mets (Note: Pick from Atlanta Braves as compensation for signing of free agent Tom Glavine)	First baseman	Arizona State
19	Andrew Cashner	Chicago Cubs	Right-handed pitcher	TCU
20	Josh Fields	Seattle Mariners	Right-handed pitcher	Georgia
21	Ryan Perry	Detroit Tigers	Right-handed pitcher	Arizona
22	Reese Havens	New York Mets	Shortstop	South Carolina
23	Allan Dykstra	San Diego Padres	First baseman	Wake Forest
24	Anthony Hewitt	Philadelphia Phillies	Shortstop	Salisbury School (CT)
25	Christian Friedrich	Colorado Rockies	Left-handed pitcher	Eastern Kentucky
26	Daniel Schlereth	Arizona Diamondbacks	Left-handed pitcher	Arizona
27	Carlos Gutiérrez	Minnesota Twins (Note: Pick from Los Angeles Angels of Anaheim as compensation for signing of free agent Torii Hunter)	Right-handed pitcher	Miami (FL)
28	Gerrit Cole*	New York Yankees	Right-handed pitcher	Orange Lutheran High School (CA)
29	Lonnie Chisenhall	Cleveland Indians	Shortstop	Pitt Community College (NC)
30	Casey Kelly	Boston Red Sox	Right-handed pitcher	Sarasota High School (FL)

Supplemental first round selections

Pick	Player	Team	Position	School
31	Steven Hunt	Minnesota Twins (Note: Supplemental pick as compensation for signing of free agent Torii Hunter)	Right-handed pitcher	Tulane
32	Jake Odorizzi	Milwaukee Brewers (Note: Supplemental pick as compensation for signing of free agent Francisco Cordero)	Right-handed pitcher	Highland High School (IL)
33	Bradley Holt	New York Mets (Note: Supplemental pick as compensation for loss of free agent Tom Glavine)	Right-handed pitcher	UNC Wilmington
34	Zach Collier	Philadelphia Phillies (Note: Supplemental pick as compensation for loss of free agent Aaron Rowand)	Outfielder	Chino Hills High School (CA)
35	Evan Frederickson	Milwaukee Brewers (Note: Supplemental pick as compensation for loss of free agent Scott Linebrink)	Left-handed pitcher	San Francisco
36	Michael Montgomery	Kansas City Royals (Note: Supplemental pick as compensation for loss of free agent David Riske)	Left-handed pitcher	Hart High School (CA)
37	Conor Gillaspie	San Francisco Giants (Note: Supplemental pick as compensation for loss of free agent Pedro Feliz)	Third baseman	Wichita State
38	Jordan Lyles	Houston Astros (Note: Supplemental pick as compensation for loss of free agent Trever Miller)	Right-handed pitcher	Hartsville High School (SC)
39	Lance Lynn	St. Louis Cardinals (Note: Supplemental pick as compensation for loss of free agent Troy Percival)	Right-handed pitcher	Ole Miss
40	Brett DeVall	Atlanta Braves (Note: Supplemental pick as compensation for loss of free agent Ron Mahay)	Left-handed pitcher	Niceville High School (FL)
41	Ryan Flaherty	Chicago Cubs (Note: Supplemental pick as compensation for loss of free agent Jason Kendall)	Shortstop	Vanderbilt
42	Jaff Decker	San Diego Padres (Note: Supplemental pick as compensation for loss of free agent Doug Brocail)	Outfielder	Sunrise Mountain High School (AZ)
43	Wade Miley	Arizona Diamondbacks (Note: Supplemental pick as compensation for loss of free agent Liván Hernández)	Left-handed pitcher	Southeastern Louisiana
44	Jeremy Bleich	New York Yankees (Note: Supplemental pick as compensation for loss of free agent Luis Vizcaíno)	Left-handed pitcher	Stanford
45	Bryan Price	Boston Red Sox (Note: Supplemental pick as compensation for loss of free agent Éric Gagné)	Right-handed pitcher	Rice
46	Logan Forsythe	San Diego Padres (Note: Supplemental pick as compensation for loss of free agent Mike Cameron)	Third baseman	Arkansas

Compensation picks

== Other notable players ==
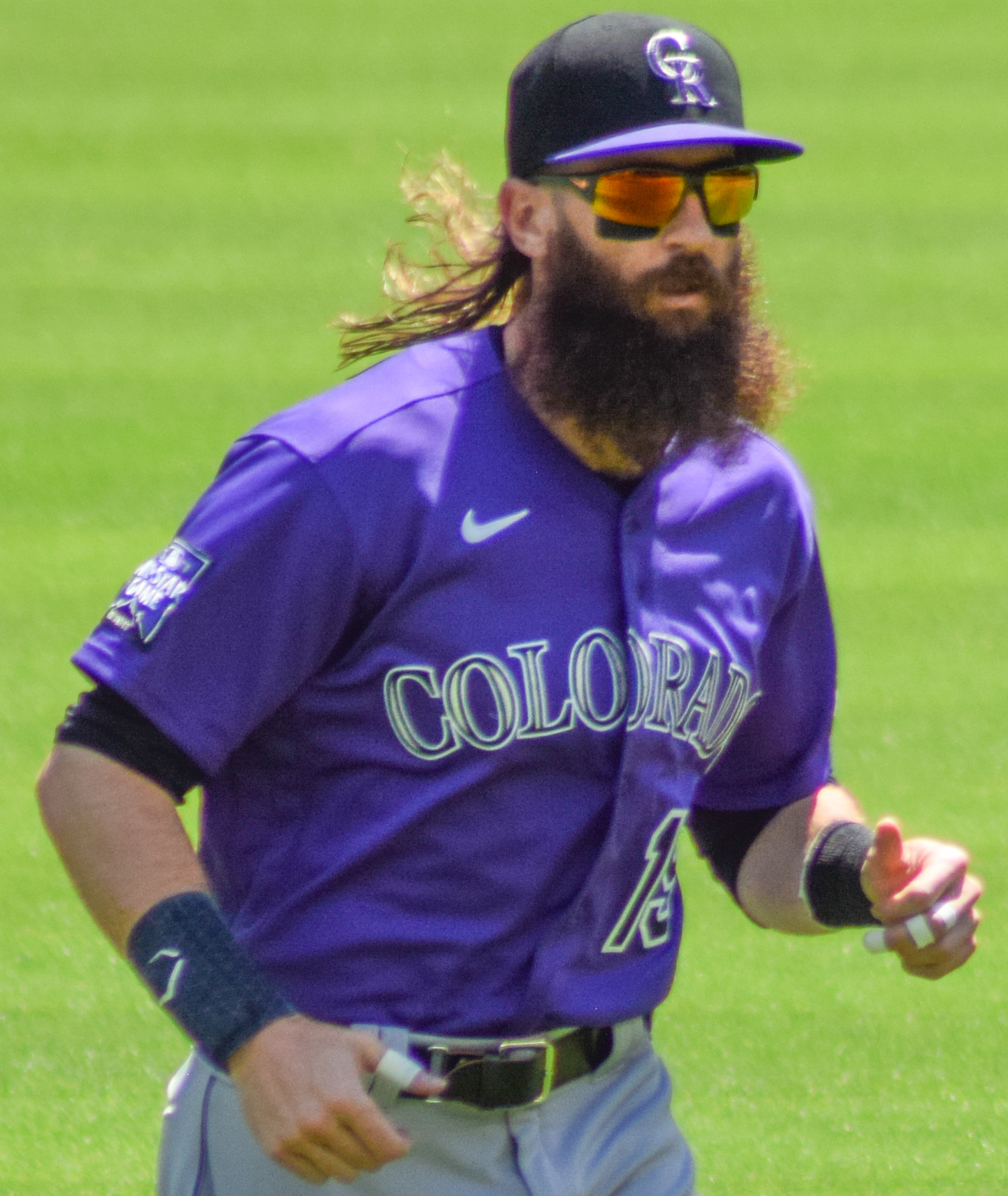
The Colorado Rockies selected Charlie Blackmon in the second round. He is a 4× MLB All-Star, 2× Silver Slugger award winner, and the 2017 National League batting champion.

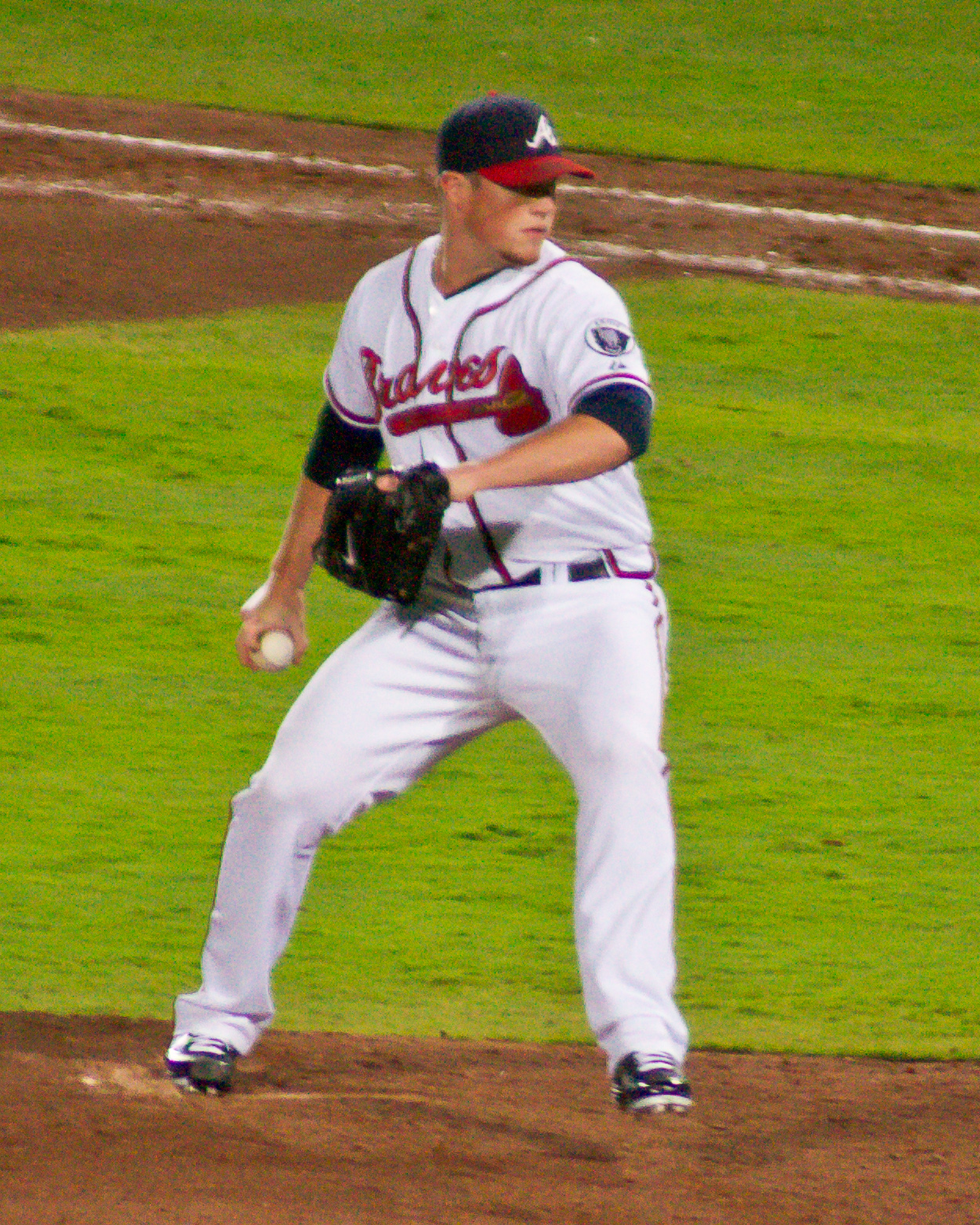
The Atlanta Braves selected Craig Kimbrel in the third round. The 9× All-Star won the 2011 National League Rookie of the Year award.

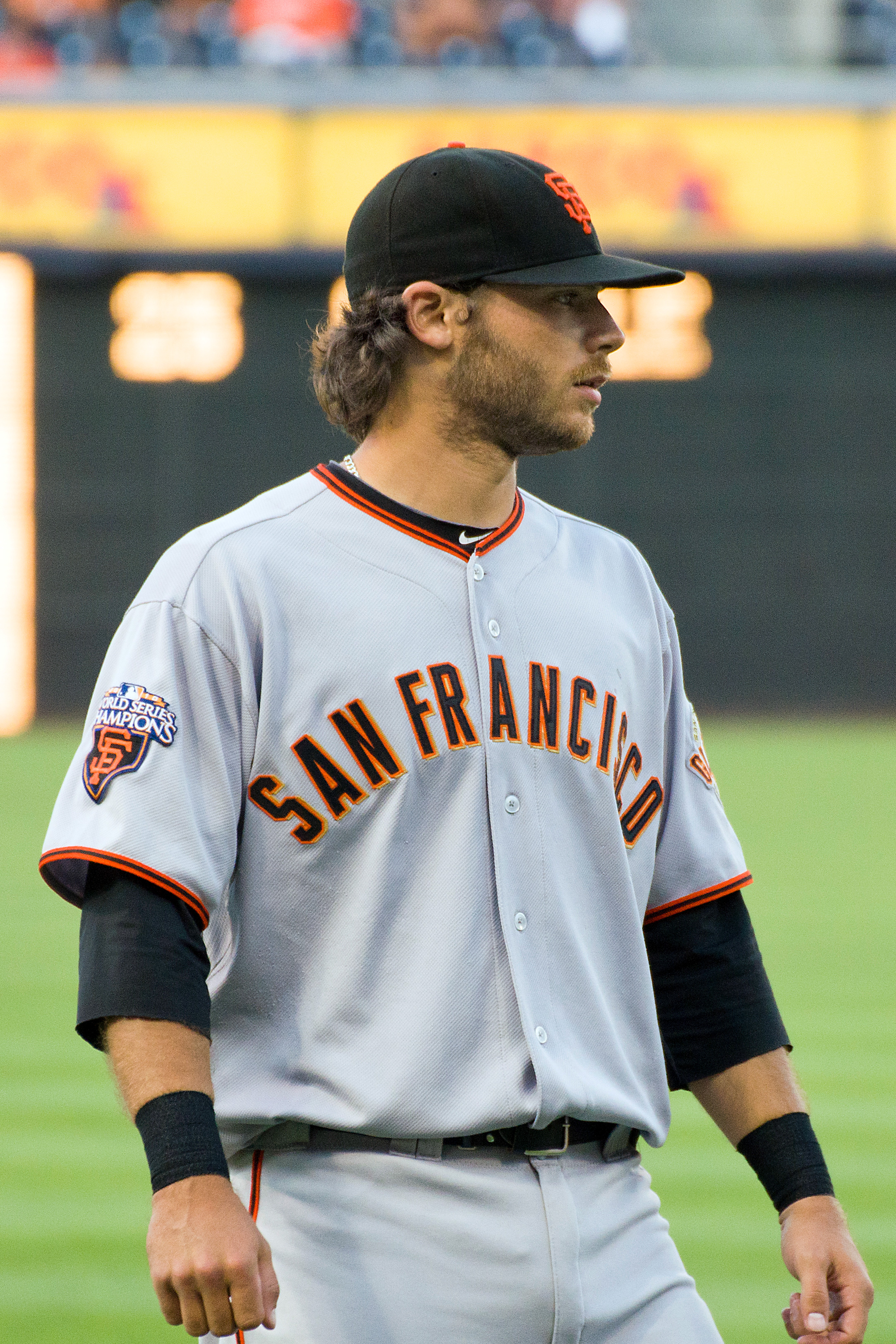
The San Francisco Giants selected Brandon Crawford in the fourth round. The 3× All-Star won four Gold Glove Awards at shortstop, the 2015 Silver Slugger Award at shortstop and the 2012, and 2014 World Series.

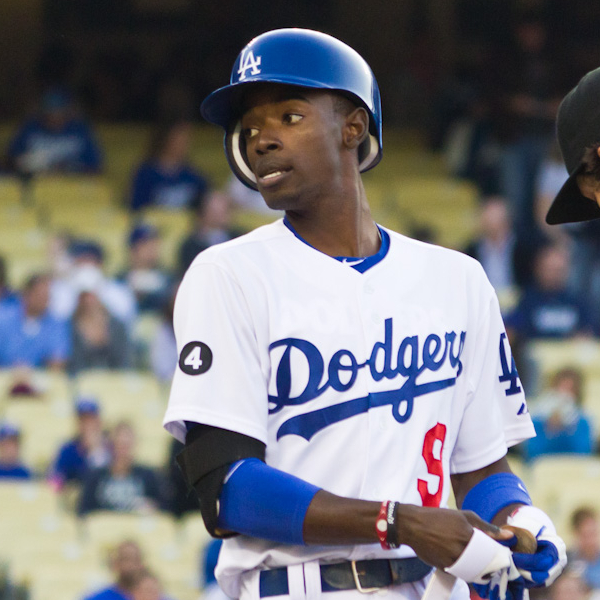
The Los Angeles Dodgers selected Dee Strange-Gordon in the fourth round. A two-time All-Star, his 2015 breakout season saw him win the Gold Glove Award at second base, the Silver Slugger Award at second base, and lead the National League in batting average, and stolen bases.

Round	Pick	Player	Team	Position	School
2	47	Kyle Lobstein	Tampa Bay Rays	Pitcher	Coconino High School (AZ)
2	48	Tanner Scheppers	Pittsburgh Pirates	Pitcher	Fresno State
2	49	Johnny Giavotella	Kansas City Royals	Second baseman	New Orleans
2	50	Xavier Avery	Baltimore Orioles	Outfielder	Cedar Grove High School (GA)
2	51	Anthony Gose	Philadelphia Phillies	Outfielder	Bellflower High School (CA)
2	52	Brad Hand	Florida Marlins	Pitcher	Chaska High School (MN)
2	57	Robbie Ross	Texas Rangers	Pitcher	Lexington Christian Academy (KY)
2	58	Tyson Ross	Oakland Athletics	Pitcher	California
2	59	Shane Peterson	St. Louis Cardinals	Outfielder	Long Beach State
2	60	Tyler Ladendorf	Minnesota Twins	Second baseman	Howard College (TX)
2	61	Josh Lindblom	Los Angeles Dodgers	Pitcher	Purdue
2	69	James Darnell	San Diego Padres	Third baseman	South Carolina
2	70	Zeke Spruill	Atlanta Braves	Pitcher	Kell High School (GA)
2	72	Charlie Blackmon	Colorado Rockies	Outfielder	Georgia Tech
2	73	Bryan Shaw	Arizona Diamondbacks	Pitcher	Long Beach State
2	74	Tyler Chatwood	Los Angeles Angels of Anaheim	Pitcher	Redlands East Valley High School (CA)
3	79	Jordy Mercer	Pittsburgh Pirates	Shortstop	Oklahoma State
3	81	L. J. Hoes	Baltimore Orioles	Second baseman	St. John's College High School (DC)
3	82	Roger Kieschnick	San Francisco Giants	Outfielder	Texas Tech
3	83	Edgar Olmos	Florida Marlins	Pitcher	Birmingham High School (CA)
3	84	Zach Stewart	Cincinnati Reds	Pitcher	Texas Tech
3	85	Stephen Fife	Boston Red Sox	Pitcher	Utah
3	86	Brent Morel	Chicago White Sox	Third baseman	Cal Poly
3	87	Danny Espinosa	Washington Nationals	Shortstop	Long Beach State
3	94	Logan Schafer	Milwaukee Brewers	Outfielder	Cal Poly
3	96	Craig Kimbrel	Atlanta Braves	Pitcher	Wallace State Community College
3	97	Chris Carpenter	Chicago Cubs	Pitcher	Kent State
3	100	Kirk Nieuwenhuis	New York Mets	Outfielder	Azusa Pacific
3	101	Blake Tekotte	San Diego Padres	Outfielder	Miami (FL)
3	102	Vance Worley	Philadelphia Phillies	Pitcher	Long Beach State
3	106	David Adams	New York Yankees	Second Baseman	Virginia
3	107	Cord Phelps	Cleveland Indians	Second Baseman	Stanford
3	108	Kyle Weiland	Boston Red Sox	Pitcher	Notre Dame
3	110	Jonathan Pettibone	Philadelphia Phillies	Pitcher	Esperanza High School (CA)
4	114	Chase d'Arnaud	Pittsburgh Pirates	Shortstop	Pepperdine
4	115	Tim Melville	Kansas City Royals	Pitcher	Wentzville Holt High School (MO)
4	116	Kyle Hudson	Baltimore Orioles	Outfielder	Illinois
4	117	Brandon Crawford	San Francisco Giants	Shortstop	UCLA
4	123	Joe Wieland	Texas Rangers	Pitcher	Bishop Manogue Catholic High School (NV)
4	127	Dee Strange-Gordon	Los Angeles Dodgers	Shortstop	Southeastern University
4	135	Jason Kipnis*	San Diego Padres	Outfielder	Arizona State
4	136	Trevor May	Philadelphia Phillies	Pitcher	Kelso High School (WA)
4	139	Buddy Boshers	Los Angeles Angels of Anaheim	Pitcher	Calhoun Community College
4	140	Corban Joseph	New York Yankees	Shortstop	Franklin High School (TN)
5	144	Justin Wilson	Pittsburgh Pirates	Pitcher	Fresno State
5	145	John Lamb	Kansas City Royals	Pitcher	Laguna Hills High School (CA)
5	150	Daniel Hudson	Chicago White Sox	Pitcher	Old Dominion
5	151	Adrian Nieto	Washington Nationals	Catcher	American Heritage School (FL)
5	155	Jermaine Curtis	St. Louis Cardinals	Third baseman	UCLA
5	159	Tyler Pastornicky	Toronto Blue Jays	Shortstop	IMG Academy (FL)
5	163	Alex Avila	Detroit Tigers	Catcher	Alabama
5	165	Anthony Bass	San Diego Padres	Pitcher	Wayne State
5	167	Chris Dominguez	Colorado Rockies	Third baseman	Louisville
5	168	Collin Cowgill	Arizona Diamondbacks	Outfielder	Kentucky
5	171	Zach Putnam	Cleveland Indians	Pitcher	Michigan Wolverines
6	174	Robbie Grossman	Pittsburgh Pirates	Outfielder	Cy-Fair High School (TX)
6	177	Eric Surkamp	San Francisco Giants	Pitcher	NC State
6	182	J. B. Shuck	Houston Astros	Outfielder	Ohio State
6	183	Richard Bleier	Texas Rangers	Pitcher	Florida Gulf Coast
6	185	Eric Fornataro	St. Louis Cardinals	Pitcher	Miami Dade College
6	191	Josh Harrison	Chicago Cubs	Second baseman	Cincinnati
6	194	Josh Satin	New York Mets	Second Baseman	California
6	195	Cole Figueroa	San Diego Padres	Shortstop	Florida
6	200	Brett Marshall	New York Yankees	Pitcher	Sterling High School (TX)
6	202	Ryan Lavarnway	Boston Red Sox	Third baseman	Yale
7	206	Caleb Joseph	Baltimore Orioles	Catcher	Lipscomb
7	209	Pedro Villarreal	Cincinnati Reds	Pitcher	Howard
7	210	Jordan Danks	Chicago White Sox	Outfielder	Texas
7	219	Eric Thames	Toronto Blue Jays	Outfielder	Pepperdine
7	229	Will Smith	Los Angeles Angels of Anaheim	Pitcher	Gulf Coast Community College
7	230	Kyle Higashioka	New York Yankees	Catcher	Edison High School (CA)
7	232	Tim Federowicz	Boston Red Sox	Catcher	North Carolina
8	237	Scott Barnes	San Francisco Giants	Pitcher	St. John's
8	238	Isaac Galloway	Florida Marlins	Outfielder	Los Osos High School (CA)
8	247	Nick Buss	Los Angeles Dodgers	Outfielder	USC
8	248	Erik Komatsu	Milwaukee Brewers	Outfielder	Cal State Fullerton
8	249	Evan Crawford	Toronto Blue Jays	Pitcher	Auburn
8	250	Brett Oberholtzer	Atlanta Braves	Pitcher	Seminole State College of Florida
8	252	Bobby LaFromboise	Seattle Mariners	Pitcher	New Mexico
8	253	Andy Dirks	Detroit Tigers	Outfielder	Wichita State
8	254	Eric Campbell	New York Mets	Third baseman	Boston College
9	264	Matt Hague	Pittsburgh Pirates	Third baseman	Oklahoma State
9	268	Dan Jennings	Florida Marlins	Pitcher	Nebraska
9	269	Dave Sappelt	Cincinnati Reds	Outfielder	Coastal Carolina
9	281	Jay Jackson	Chicago Cubs	Pitcher	Furman
9	292	Christian Vázquez	Boston Red Sox	Catcher	Puerto Rico Baseball Academy and High School (PR)
10	296	Chris Herrmann*	Baltimore Orioles	Third baseman	Alvin Community College
10	301	Tommy Milone	Washington Nationals	Pitcher	Southern California
10	305	Alex Castellanos	St. Louis Cardinals	Second baseman	Belmont Abbey College
10	309	Danny Farquhar	Toronto Blue Jays	Pitcher	Louisiana
10	310	J. J. Hoover	Atlanta Braves	Pitcher	Calhoun Community College
10	311	Alex Wilson*	Chicago Cubs	Pitcher	Texas A&M
10	313	Robbie Weinhardt	Detroit Tigers	Pitcher	Oklahoma State
10	315	Andrew Albers	San Diego Padres	Pitcher	Kentucky
10	320	D. J. Mitchell	New York Yankees	Pitcher	Clemson

- Charles Leesman, 11th round, 330th overall by the Chicago White Sox
- Nathan Eovaldi, 11th round, 337th overall by the Los Angeles Dodgers
- Dustin Antolin, 11th round, 339th overall by the Toronto Blue Jays
- Michael Stutes, 11th round, 346th overall by the Philadelphia Phillies
- Matt Langwell, 11th round, 351st overall by the Cleveland Indians
- Matt Clark, 12th round, 375th overall by the San Diego Padres
- Ryan Weber, 12th round, 376th overall by the Philadelphia Phillies
- Daniel Webb, 12th round, 378th overall by the Arizona Diamondbacks
- Juan Perez, 13th round, 387th overall by the San Francisco Giants
- Mitch Harris, 13th round, 395th overall by the St. Louis Cardinals
- Rob Wooten, 13th round, 398th overall by the Milwaukee Brewers
- Tony Campana, 13th round, 401st overall by the Chicago Cubs
- Erik Davis, 13th round, 405th overall by the San Diego Padres
- B. J. Rosenberg, 13th round, 406th overall by the Philadelphia Phillies
- Michael Kohn, 13th round, 409th overall by the Los Angeles Angels of Anaheim
- Louis Coleman, 14th round, 421st overall by the Washington Nationals
- Michael Schwimer, 14th round, 436th overall by the Philadelphia Phillies
- David Phelps, 14th round, 440th overall by the New York Yankees
- Jason Gurka, 15th round, 446th overall by the Baltimore Orioles
- Joey Butler, 15th round, 453rd overall by the Texas Rangers
- Casey Coleman, 15th round, 461st overall by the Chicago Cubs
- Tyler Moore, 16th round, 481st overall by the Washington Nationals
- Justin Miller, 16th round, 483rd overall by the Texas Rangers
- Kolten Wong, 16th round, 486th overall by the Minnesota Twins
- Billy Burns, 16th round, 490th overall by the Atlanta Braves
- Thad Weber, 16th round, 493rd overall by the Detroit Tigers
- T. J. House, 16th round, 501st overall by the Cleveland Indians
- Brad Glenn, 17th round, 514th overall by the Oakland Athletics
- Daniel Coulombe, 17th round, 517th overall by the Los Angeles Dodgers
- Tom Koehler, 18th round, 538th overall by the Florida Marlins
- Allen Webster, 18th round, 547th overall by the Los Angeles Dodgers
- Jeff Beliveau, 18th round, 551st overall by the Chicago Cubs
- Collin McHugh, 18th round, 554th overall by the New York Mets
- Nick Vincent, 18th round, 555th overall by the San Diego Padres
- Tyler Cloyd, 18th round, 556th overall by the Philadelphia Phillies
- Brian Flynn, 18th round, 562nd overall by the Boston Red Sox
- Steve Lombardozzi Jr., 19th round, 571st overall by the Washington Nationals
- Xavier Scruggs, 19th round, 575th overall by the St. Louis Cardinals
- David Rollins, 19th round, 577th overall by the Los Angeles Dodgers
- Steve Susdorf, 19th round, 586th overall by the Philadelphia Phillies
- Aaron Barrett, 20th round, 606th overall by the Minnesota Twins
- Ryan Lollis, 20th round, 613th overall by the Detroit Tigers
- Pat Venditte, 20th round, 620th overall by the New York Yankees
- Alex Meyer, 20th round, 622nd overall by the Boston Red Sox
- Ryan Carpenter, 21st round, 623 overall by the Tampa Bay Rays, but did not sign
- Lucas Luetge, 21st round, 638th overall by the Milwaukee Brewers
- Logan Watkins, 21st round, 641st overall by the Chicago Cubs
- Bryan Woodall, 21st round, 648th overall by the Arizona Diamondbacks
- Blaine Hardy, 22nd round, 655th overall by the Kansas City Royals
- Preston Guilmet, 22nd round, 664th overall by the Oakland Athletics
- Chris Schwinden, 22nd round, 674th overall by the New York Mets
- Anthony DeSclafani, 22nd round, 682nd overall by the Boston Red Sox, but did not sign
- Chris Rusin, 23rd round, 694th overall by the Oakland Athletics
- Brandon Maurer, 23rd round, 702nd overall by the Seattle Mariners
- Tommy Field, 24th round, 737th overall by the Colorado Rockies
- Taylor Jungmann, 24th round, 739th overall by the Los Angeles Angels of Anaheim
- Taylor Thompson, 25th round, 750th overall by the Chicago White Sox
- Tanner Roark, 25th round, 753rd overall by the Texas Rangers
- Jerry Sands, 25th round, 757th overall by the Los Angeles Dodgers
- Andy Burns, 25th round, 767th overall by the Colorado Rockies
- Josh Spence, 25th round, 768th overall by the Arizona Diamondbacks
- Cory Mazzoni, 26th round, 781st overall by the Washington Nationals
- Dean Anna, 26th round, 795th overall by the San Diego Padres
- Elih Villanueva, 27th round, 808th overall by the Florida Marlins
- Austin Adams, 27th round, 818th overall by the Milwaukee Brewers
- Anthony Rendon, 27th round, 820th overall by the Atlanta Braves, but did not sign
- Sonny Gray, 27th round, 821st overall by the Chicago Cubs, but did not sign
- Ryan Cook, 27th round, 828th overall by the Arizona Diamondbacks
- Hunter Cervenka, 27th round, 832nd overall by the Boston Red Sox
- Kevin Mattison, 28th round, 838th overall by the Florida Marlins
- Nate Freiman, 28th round, 843rd overall by the Texas Rangers
- Dusty Coleman, 28th round, 844th overall by the Oakland Athletics
- Chris Heston, 29th round, 871st overall by the Washington Nationals
- Keon Broxton, 29th round, 886th overall by the Philadelphia Phillies
- Michael Tonkin, 30th round, 906th overall by the Minnesota Twins
- James McCann, 31st round, 930th overall by the Chicago White Sox
- Mickey Storey, 31st round, 934th overall by the Oakland Athletics
- Matt Magill, 31st round, 937th overall by the Los Angeles Dodgers
- Sean Gilmartin, 31st round, 945th overall by the San Diego Padres
- John Hicks, 31st round, 949th overall by the Los Angeles Angels of Anaheim
- Justin Freeman, 32nd round, 959th overall by the Cincinnati Reds
- Sam Freeman, 32nd round, 965th overall by the St. Louis Cardinals
- Adam Conley, 32nd round, 966th overall by the Minnesota Twins, but did not sign
- Nick Christiani, 32nd round, 981st overall by the Cleveland Indians
- Travis Shaw, 32nd round, 982nd overall by the Boston Red Sox
- Shawn Armstrong, 33rd round, 992nd overall by the Houston Astros, but did not sign
- Dan Robertson, 33rd round, 1005th overall by the San Diego Padres
- Roberto Perez, 33rd round, 1011th overall by the Cleveland Indians
- Marcus Semien, 34th round, 1020th overall by the Chicago White Sox, but did not sign
- Jake Elmore, 34th round, 1038th overall by the Arizona Diamondbacks
- Andrew Taylor, 34th round, 1039th overall by the Los Angeles Angels of Anaheim
- Carson Blair, 35th round, 1072nd overall by the Boston Red Sox
- Jon Berti, 36th round, 1084th overall by the Oakland Athletics, but did not sign
- Chris Dwyer, 36th round, 1100th overall by the New York Yankees
- Adam Warren, 36th round, 1101st overall by the Cleveland Indians
- Bradin Hagens, 37th round, 1105th overall by the Kansas City Royals
- Matt Andriese, 37th round, 1113th overall by the Texas Rangers
- Dallas Beeler, 37th round, 1119th overall by the Toronto Blue Jays
- Erik Hamren, 37th round, 1121st overall by the Chicago Cubs
- Jarred Cosart, 38th round, 1156th overall by the Philadelphia Phillies
- Mikie Mahtook, 39th round, 1168th overall by the Florida Marlins
- Brad Miller, 39th round, 1173rd overall by the Texas Rangers
- Kyle Hendricks, 39th round, 1189th overall by the Los Angeles Angels of Anaheim, but did not sign
- Yan Gomes, 39th round, 1192nd overall by the Boston Red Sox, but did not sign
- Donn Roach, 40th round, 1219th overall by the Los Angeles Angels of Anaheim
- Kevin Siegrist, 41st round, 1235th overall by the St. Louis Cardinals
- Jett Bandy, 41st round, 1237th overall by the Los Angeles Dodgers
- Stephen Pryor, 42nd round, 1263rd overall by the Texas Rangers
- Brad Brach, 42nd round, 1275th overall by the San Diego Padres
- Oliver Drake, 43rd round, 1286th overall by the Baltimore Orioles
- Cody Eppley, 43rd round, 1293rd overall by the Texas Rangers
- Nick Maronde, 43rd round, 1294th overall by the Oakland Athletics
- C. J. Cron, 44th round, 1320th overall by the Chicago White Sox
- Scott McGough, 46th round, 1371st overall by the Pittsburgh Pirates
- Rob Brantly, 46th round, 1378th overall by the Washington Nationals
- J. R. Graham, 46th round, 1381st overall by the Oakland Athletics
- Tony Zych, 46th round, 1386th overall by the Chicago Cubs
- Giovanni Soto, 46th round, 1390th overall by the Philadelphia Phillies
- George Springer, 48th round, 1437th overall by the Minnesota Twins, but did not sign
- Alex Dickerson, 48th round, 1432nd overall by the Washington Nationals
- Rob Scahill, 48th round, 1448th overall by the New York Yankees
- Tyler Anderson, 50th round, 1491st overall by the Minnesota Twins
- Sean Nolin, 50th round, 1492nd overall by the Milwaukee Brewers

=== NFL players drafted ===
- Kyle Long, 23rd round, 690th overall by the Chicago White Sox, but did not sign
- Eric Decker, 39th round, 1178th overall by the Milwaukee Brewers, but did not sign
- Pat White, 49th round, 1457th overall by the Cincinnati Reds, but did not sign

== Notes ==
On September 9, 2008, Conor Gillaspie, the 37th pick in the 2008 draft, made his Major League debut, becoming the first from his draft class to do so. Buster Posey was the first 2008 draftee to play in post-season and eventually won the 2010 World Series, the 2012 World Series, and the 2014 World Series with the San Francisco Giants. Posey was also named 2010 NL Rookie of the Year, and he won 2012 National League Most Valuable Player award and the 2012, 2014 & 2015 Silver Slugger awards.

2011 Rookie of the Year Craig Kimbrel was drafted 96th overall by the Atlanta Braves in the 3rd round.

Ryan Westmoreland, who the Boston Red Sox drafted in the fifth round, became one of the best prospects in baseball before having brain surgery twice to repair a cavernous malformation.

Brothers Caleb and Corban Joseph were both chosen in the 2008 draft. The New York Yankees selected Corban in the fourth round, with the 140th overall selection, out of Franklin High School in Franklin, Tennessee, while the Baltimore Orioles drafted Caleb in the seventh round, with the 206th overall selection, out of Lipscomb University.

West Virginia quarterback Pat White was drafted in the 49th round by the Cincinnati Reds, even though he had not played baseball since his senior year of high school in 2004, when he was drafted by the Anaheim Angels.

== Negro leagues special draft ==
Prior to the start of the draft, the League held a special round consisting of surviving Negro leagues players to acknowledge and rectify their exclusion from the major leagues on the basis of race in the past. The idea of the special draft was conceived by Hall of Famer Dave Winfield. Each major league team drafted one player from the Negro leagues. Notable in the draft were Emilio Navarro (who, at 102 years of age at the time of the draft, was believed to be the oldest living professional ballplayer) and Mamie "Peanut" Johnson, the first woman ever drafted.

Player	MLB Team	Position	Negro league team(s)
Hubert Simmons	Los Angeles Angels of Anaheim	Shortstop	Kansas City Monarchs
Neale 'Bobo' Henderson	Baltimore Orioles	Pitcher/Outfielder	Baltimore Elite Giants
Jim 'Fireball' Colzie	Boston Red Sox	Pitcher	Indianapolis Clowns, Atlanta Black Crackers
Hank Presswood	Chicago White Sox	Shortstop/Third baseman	Cleveland Buckeyes, Kansas City Monarchs
Otha "Li'l Catch" Bailey	Cleveland Indians	Catcher	Birmingham Black Barons, Chattanooga Choo-Choos, Cleveland Buckeyes, Houston/New Orleans Eagles
Cecil Kaiser	Detroit Tigers	Pitcher/First baseman/Outfielder	Homestead Grays, Pittsburgh Crawfords
Ulysses Hollimon	Kansas City Royals	Pitcher	Birmingham Black Barons, Baltimore Elite Giants
Bill 'Lefty' Bell	Minnesota Twins	Pitcher	Birmingham Black Barons, Kansas City Monarchs
Emilio 'Millito' Navarro	New York Yankees	Shortstop/Second baseman/Third baseman	Cuban Stars
Irvin Castille	Oakland Athletics	Shortstop	Birmingham Black Barons
John Miles	Seattle Mariners	Third baseman/Outfielder	Chicago American Giants
Walter Lee Gibbons	Tampa Bay Rays	Pitcher	Philadelphia Stars, New York Black Yankees, Indianapolis Clowns
Charley Pride	Texas Rangers	Pitcher	Birmingham Black Barons, Memphis Red Sox
Harold Gould	Toronto Blue Jays	Pitcher	Philadelphia Stars
Bob Mitchell	Arizona Diamondbacks	Pitcher	Kansas City Monarchs
James 'Red' Moore	Atlanta Braves	First baseman	Atlanta Black Crackers, Baltimore Elite Giants, Newark Eagles
Walt Owens	Chicago Cubs	Pitcher/First baseman	Detroit Stars
Charlie Davis	Cincinnati Reds	Pitcher	Memphis Red Sox
Mack 'The Knife' Pride	Colorado Rockies	Pitcher	Memphis Red Sox, Kansas City Monarchs
Enrique Maroto	Florida Marlins	Pitcher	Kansas City Monarchs
Bill Blair	Houston Astros	Pitcher	Detroit Stars, Indianapolis Clowns
Andrew Porter	Los Angeles Dodgers	Pitcher	Baltimore Elite Giants, Newark Eagles, Indianapolis Clowns, Cleveland Buckeyes
Joseph B. Scott	Milwaukee Brewers	First baseman/Outfielder	Memphis Red Sox, New York Black Yankees
Robert Scott	New York Mets	Pitcher/First baseman	Memphis Red Sox, New York Black Yankees
Mahlon Duckett	Philadelphia Phillies	First baseman/Second Baseman	Philadelphia Stars, Indianapolis Clowns
James Tillman	Pittsburgh Pirates	Catcher	Homestead Grays
'Prince' Joe Henry	St. Louis Cardinals	Second baseman/Third Baseman	Philadelphia Stars, Indianapolis ClownsDetroit Stars
Walter McCoy	San Diego Padres	Pitcher	Chicago American Giants, Kansas City Monarchs
Carlos Manuel Santiago	San Francisco Giants	Shortstop/Second baseman	New York Cubans
Mamie 'Peanut' Johnson	Washington Nationals	Pitcher	Indianapolis Clowns

Preceded by David Price	1st Overall Picks; Tim Beckham	Succeeded by Stephen Strasburg
