= Corban Joseph =

American baseball player (born 1988)

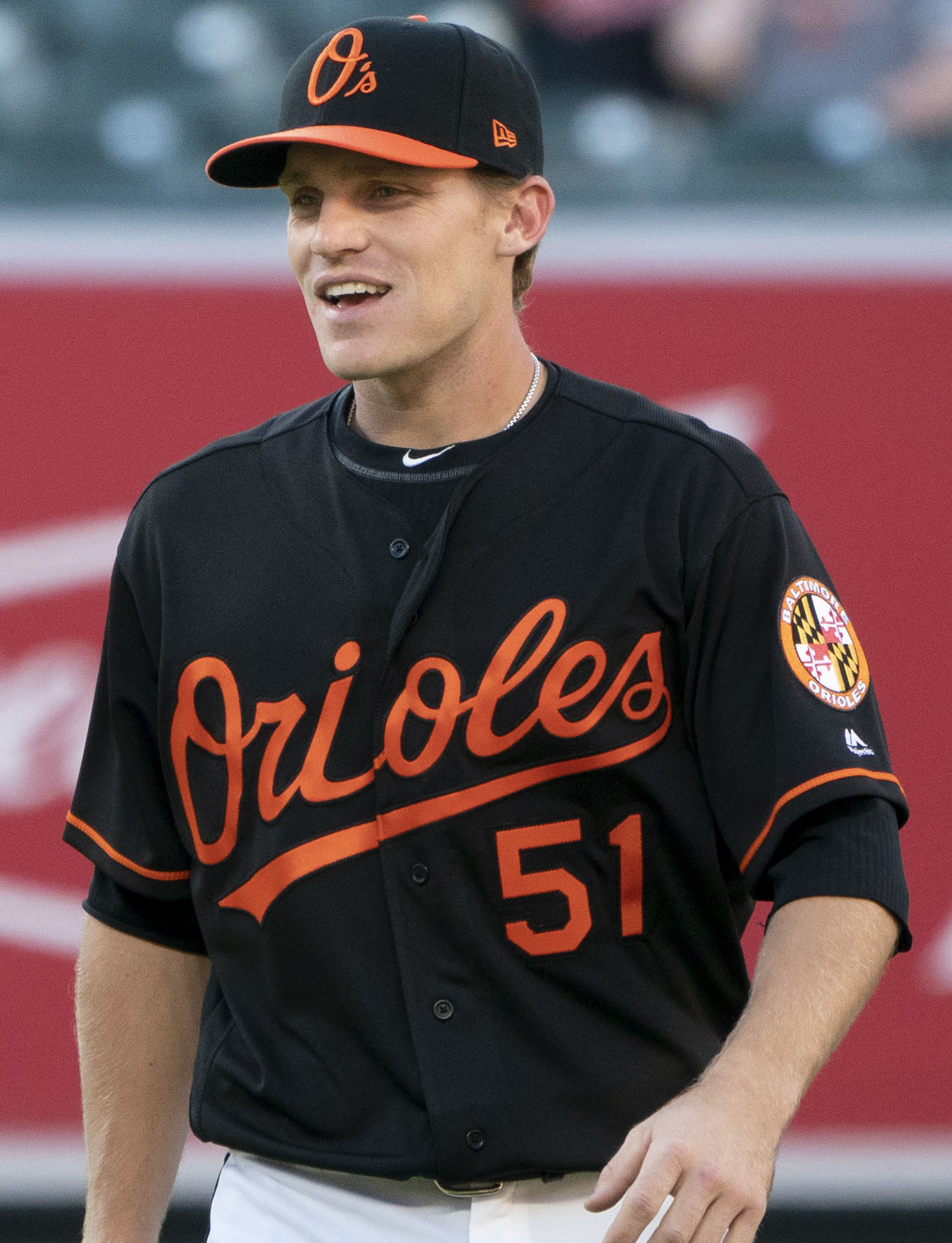
- Joseph with the Baltimore Orioles
- Second baseman
- Born: October 28, 1988 (age 38); Nashville, Tennessee, U.S.
- Batted: Left Threw: Right

MLB debut
- May 13, 2013, for the New York Yankees

Last MLB appearance
- September 28, 2019, for the Pittsburgh Pirates

MLB statistics
- Batting average: .170
- Home runs: 1
- Runs batted in: 10
- Stats at Baseball Reference

Teams
- New York Yankees (2013); Baltimore Orioles (2018); Oakland Athletics (2019); San Francisco Giants (2019); Pittsburgh Pirates (2019)

Corban Reece Joseph (born October 28, 1988) is an American former professional baseball second baseman. He played in Major League Baseball (MLB) for the New York Yankees, Baltimore Orioles, Oakland Athletics, San Francisco Giants, and Pittsburgh Pirates.

== Career ==
Joseph attended Franklin High School in Franklin, Tennessee, where he played for the high school baseball team. In his sophomore year, he was named All-Midstate for baseball. In his senior year, he batted .510 with 15 home runs and 58 runs batted in (RBIs) for Franklin and was named Midstate Player of the Year. He committed to attend the University of Kentucky to play for the Kentucky Wildcats baseball team after his high school graduation in 2008.

=== New York Yankees ===
Joseph was drafted by the New York Yankees in the fourth round, with the 140th overall selection, of the 2008 Major League Baseball draft out of Franklin High School. He signed with the Yankees on June 10. Joseph joined the Rookie-level Gulf Coast Yankees. In 2009, he played for the Class-A Charleston RiverDogs, where he named the South Atlantic League's player of the month for July and a post-season all-star third baseman despite playing just 37 games at third.

He began the 2010 season with the Tampa Yankees of the Class A-Advanced Florida State League, where he had a .302 batting average, six home runs and 52 RBIs before he was promoted to the Trenton Thunder of the Class AA Eastern League in August. Joseph spent the entire 2011 season with the Thunder. He was added to the Yankees 40 man roster on November 18, 2011. In 2012, he played for the Scranton/Wilkes-Barre Yankees of the Class AAA International League.

After starting the 2013 season with Scranton/Wilkes-Barre, the Yankees promoted Joseph on April 30, when they placed Kevin Youkilis on the disabled list. However, he was optioned to the minors two days later without appearing in a game. The Yankees recalled Joseph on May 13 as the 26th man in a doubleheader against the Cleveland Indians, starting him at first base during the first game and second base in the second game. During the second game of the doubleheader, Joseph got his first career base hit. He was then optioned back to Scranton/Wilkes-Barre after the doubleheader.

Joseph was outrighted off the Yankees roster on November 20, 2013. He was released by the Yankees on August 27, 2014.

=== Atlanta Braves ===
On November 19, 2014, he signed a minor league deal with the Atlanta Braves and was assigned to the Double-A Mississippi Braves to begin the year. He hit .268 with 20 RBI before being released by the Braves on June 2, 2015.

=== Baltimore Orioles ===
On June 16, 2015, Joseph signed a minor league contract with the Baltimore Orioles. He finished the year with the Double-A Bowie Baysox, slashing .349 in 22 games. He split the 2016 season between Bowie and the Triple-A Norfolk Tides, posting a .315/.369/.442 batting line with 8 home runs and 46 RBI. He elected free agency on November 7, 2016.

=== Washington Nationals ===
On November 19, 2016, he agreed to terms with the Washington Nationals on a minor league deal with an invitation to spring training, although he was reassigned to minor league camp on March 13, 2017. He spent the year split between the Double-A Harrisburg Senators and the Triple-A Syracuse Chiefs, accumulating a .275/.331/.398 batting line with 7 home runs and 40 RBI. Joseph elected free agency following the season on November 6.

=== Baltimore Orioles (second stint) ===
On February 19, 2018, Joseph signed a minor league deal with the Orioles. Joseph was recalled to the majors on June 15 and started at first base, his first major league appearance in over five years. His brother, catcher Caleb Joseph was on the O's roster while he was up. He was next optioned to the Triple–A Norfolk Tides on June 20. He was designated for assignment on June 29 then saw his contract purchased again on September 7, 2018. In 14 major league games for Baltimore, Joseph notched 4 hits in 19 plate appearances. He was outrighted on November 1, then re-signed with the Orioles a minor league deal on November 5.

=== Oakland Athletics ===
The Oakland Athletics selected Joseph in the minor league phase of the Rule 5 draft at the 2018 Winter Meetings. Joseph played for the Las Vegas Aviators of the Triple-A Pacific Coast League. On August 14, the Athletics promoted Joseph to the major leagues. He hit his first career major league home run on August 15, in a close 7-6 victory, over the visiting Houston Astros. On September 1, Joseph was designated for assignment.

=== San Francisco Giants ===
On September 3, 2019, Joseph was claimed off waivers by the San Francisco Giants. On September 14, the Giants designated Joseph for assignment after he went 1-for-16 in 8 games for the club.

=== Pittsburgh Pirates ===
On September 16, 2019, Joseph was claimed off waivers by the Pittsburgh Pirates. In 9 games for Pittsburgh, he went 2-for-11 (.182). On October 25, Joseph was removed from the 40-man roster and sent outright to the Triple-A Indianapolis Indians. He elected free agency on October 31.

=== Chicago Cubs ===
On January 31, 2020, Joseph signed a minor league contract with the Chicago Cubs. He did not play in a game in 2020 due to the cancellation of the minor league season because of the COVID-19 pandemic. Joseph was released by the Cubs organization on May 28.

=== Washington Nationals (second stint) ===
On May 29, 2021, Joseph signed a minor league contract with the Washington Nationals organization. In 32 games split between the Double-A Harrisburg Senators and Triple-A Rochester Red Wings, he slashed a combined .282/.355/.409 with two home runs and 13 RBI. Joseph was released by the Nationals organization on January 7, 2022.

== Personal life ==
Joseph's brother, Caleb, has also played in MLB. Caleb was also selected in the 2008 draft; he was chosen by the Baltimore Orioles in the seventh round. They briefly played together with the Orioles in 2018. Their father, Mark, played college baseball for Lipscomb.

== See also ==
- Rule 5 draft results
