= Charlie Davis (baseball) =

American baseball player

- Pitcher
- Born: March 15, 1927; Fort Valley, Georgia, U. S.
- Died: March 17, 2016 (aged 89); Cincinnati, Ohio, U. S.

Negro Baseball League debut
- 1950, for the Memphis Red Sox

Last appearance
- 1955, for the Memphis Red Sox

Teams
- Birmingham Black Barons (1950); Memphis Red Sox (1950−1955)

Career highlights and awards
- East-West All Star Game (1953)

Charlie Davis (March 15, 1927 − March 17, 2016) was an American baseball player for the Negro leagues. He was scouted by Buck O'Neil to play for the Birmingham Black Barons but was traded to the Memphis Red Sox where he played his career from 1950 to 1955. He earned the name "whip" from Charlie Pride. Davis played in the 1953 East-West All Star Game, relieving Satchel Paige He later managed the Rockdale Rawhides. In 2008, he was drafted by the Cincinnati Reds in a special MLB draft for former Negro league baseball players.

He died March 17, 2016, leaving behind three daughters, and seven grandchildren.
