= Ryan Westmoreland =

American baseball player (born 1990)

- Outfielder
- Born: April 27, 1990 (age 36); Newport, Rhode Island, U.S.
- Bats: Left Throws: Right
- Stats at Baseball Reference

Ryan Michael Westmoreland (born April 27, 1990) is a former American professional baseball player. An outfielder, he played in minor league baseball in the Boston Red Sox organization. Westmoreland was considered one of the best prospects in baseball. However, his career was limited by a medical condition that required two brain surgeries.

A star baseball player in high school, Westmoreland was twice named to the Rhode Island All-State team and was named the Rhode Island player of the year as a senior. The Red Sox selected Westmoreland in the 2008 Major League Baseball draft and signed him with a $2 million signing bonus. Baseball America ranked Westmoreland among the best prospects in baseball in 2010. However, he began to experience symptoms of a cavernous malformation that year, which required two surgeries and years of rehabilitation. Westmoreland announced his retirement in 2013.

== Career ==
Westmoreland attended Portsmouth High School in Portsmouth, Rhode Island. He was named to the All-State team in 2007 and 2008, and was named Gatorade Rhode Island Player of the Year in both years.

Westmoreland committed to attend Vanderbilt University on a baseball scholarship, allowing him to play college baseball for the Vanderbilt Commodores. Eligible in the 2008 Major League Baseball draft at the end of his high school career, Baseball America rated Westmoreland the 113th-best prospect available in the draft. However, it was rumored that he would only consider signing a professional contract with the Boston Red Sox, his hometown team.

The Red Sox drafted Westmoreland in the fifth round of the draft, with the 172nd overall selection. Westmoreland signed with the Red Sox, receiving a $2 million signing bonus. Assigned to the Lowell Spinners of the Low-A New York–Penn League, Westmoreland batted .296 with seven home runs, 35 runs batted in (RBI), and a .401 on-base percentage in 60 games during the 2009 season.

Baseball America rated Westmoreland the 21st-best prospect in baseball prior to the 2010 season. Before the season began, Westmoreland began to experience weakness, and magnetic resonance imaging diagnosed a cavernous malformation at his brainstem. In March 2010, Westmoreland had brain surgery to repair the malformation. He continued to rehabilitate in an attempt to return to professional baseball in the 2011–12 offseason. Following a setback in his rehabilitation, Westmoreland underwent a second surgery in July 2012.

Westmoreland announced his retirement from baseball on March 6, 2013. In June 2014, the Lowell Spinners retired Westmoreland's uniform number, 25, the first such honor by the Spinners for a player. A NESN biography, Red Sox Prospects: The Ryan Westmoreland Story, debuted on August 16, 2018.

== Personal life ==
Westmoreland's father, Ron, played baseball and coached for Eckerd College, and two of his uncles played professional baseball. Ron Westmoreland is treasurer and long-time co-owner of the Newport Gulls summer collegiate baseball team in the NECBL. Westmoreland married his long time girlfriend, Libby (née Pinkham) on June 26, 2020. They have a daughter, born in 2021.
