= Reese Havens =

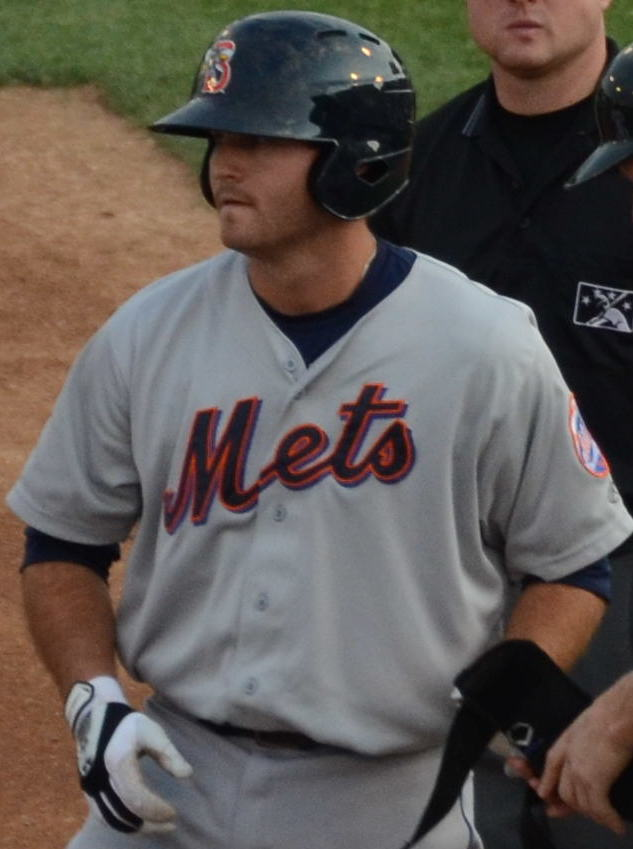
- Havens with the Binghamton Mets in 2012
- Infielder
- Born: October 20, 1986 (age 39); Sullivan's Island, South Carolina
- Bats: Left Throws: Right
- Stats at Baseball Reference

David Reese Havens (born October 20, 1986) is a former professional baseball player who was an infielder in Minor League Baseball.

== Amateur career ==
Havens was drafted by the Colorado Rockies in the 29th round of the 2005 Major League Baseball draft, but opted to play college baseball for the University of South Carolina instead. In 2006 and 2007, he played collegiate summer baseball with the Cotuit Kettleers of the Cape Cod Baseball League, and was named an all-star in both seasons.

== Professional career ==
Havens was drafted by the New York Mets in the first round of the 2008 Major League Baseball draft. He was added to the Mets 40 man roster on November 18, 2011.

Havens retired from baseball on January 22, 2014 following an injury plagued career. He never played in a major league game.
