= Caleb Joseph =

American baseball player (born 1986)

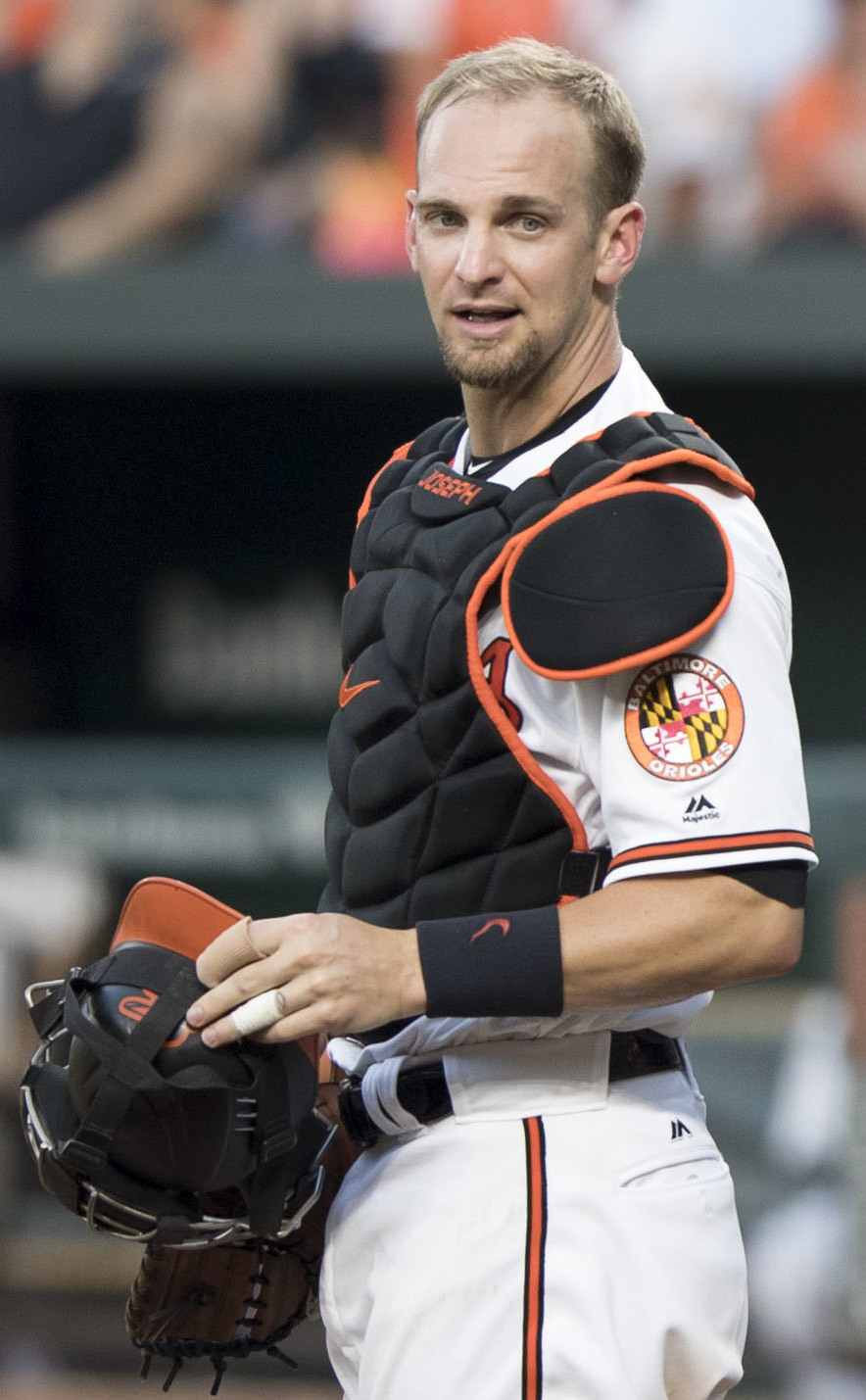
- Joseph with the Baltimore Orioles in 2017
- Catcher
- Born: June 18, 1986 (age 40); Nashville, Tennessee, U.S.
- Batted: Right Threw: Right

MLB debut
- May 7, 2014, for the Baltimore Orioles

Last MLB appearance
- September 9, 2020, for the Toronto Blue Jays

MLB statistics
- Batting average: .222
- Home runs: 32
- Runs batted in: 127
- Stats at Baseball Reference

Teams
- Baltimore Orioles (2014–2018); Arizona Diamondbacks (2019); Toronto Blue Jays (2020)

Caleb Martin Joseph (born June 18, 1986) is an American former professional baseball catcher. He played in Major League Baseball (MLB) for the Baltimore Orioles, Arizona Diamondbacks, and Toronto Blue Jays from 2014 to 2020. His brother, Corban, also played in MLB.

== Playing career ==
=== High school and college ===
Joseph attended Franklin High School in Franklin, Tennessee, where he played for the high school baseball team. He attended Lipscomb University, choosing to play college baseball for the Lipscomb Bisons in the Atlantic Sun Conference, due to the promise of more playing time than he was offered by Vanderbilt University and the University of Arkansas, where he was also recruited. In 2007, he played collegiate summer baseball with the Falmouth Commodores and Cotuit Kettleers of the Cape Cod Baseball League and was named a league all-star. In his junior year, Joseph led the Bisons with a .342 batting average, 17 home runs, and a .615 slugging percentage. He was named to the All-Conference team and was named the Most Valuable Player of the conference tournament.

=== Baltimore Orioles ===
The Baltimore Orioles drafted Joseph in the seventh round, with the 206th overall selection, of the 2008 Major League Baseball draft. He signed with the Orioles, receiving a $125,000 signing bonus and tuition payments for his final three semesters of college. In his first professional season, the Orioles assigned him to the Aberdeen IronBirds of the Low-A New York–Penn League, where he batted .261 with eight home runs and 34 runs batted in in 63 games. In 2009, the Orioles assigned Joseph to the Frederick Keys of the High-A Carolina League.

Joseph played for the Bowie Baysox of the Double-A Eastern League in 2010, and for the Scottsdale Scorpions of the Arizona Fall League after the season. The Orioles returned Joseph to Bowie in 2011 and 2012. In 2013, Joseph had a .299 batting average, 22 home runs, and 97 RBI for the Baysox. He was named an All-Star at mid-season and for the season-ending team, and was named the Eastern League's Minor League Player of the Year by Topps. At the mid-season Eastern League All-Star Game, Joseph won the Home Run Derby. The Orioles did not renew his contract, and he was not selected in the Rule 5 draft in December 2013.

In six and a half minor league seasons, he hit for a .268 average.

Joseph began the 2014 season with the Norfolk Tides, where he batted .261 with a .284 OBP and .402 slugging percentage in 22 games. He was promoted to the Orioles on May 7, going 0-for-3 in his MLB debut in a 4–3 win over the Tampa Bay Rays at Tropicana Field that night. His first major league hit was a fourth-inning single off Drew Smyly in a 4–1 loss to the Detroit Tigers at Camden Yards six nights later on May 13. He hit his first major league home run off David Huff in the ninth inning of an 8–0 triumph over the New York Yankees at Yankee Stadium on June 22.

On August 9, Joseph hit a home run in the Orioles' 10–3 win over the St. Louis Cardinals; making him the first Orioles catcher to homer in 5 consecutive games. He batted .207/.264/.354 in 246 at bats for the 2014 season.

With Matt Wieters still recovering from Tommy John surgery, Joseph began the 2015 season as the Orioles starting catcher. Joseph was hitting .243 with 4 HR and 18 RBI in 43 games until Wieters was activated on June 5, and following his activation, Joseph and Wieters split catching duties. In 100 games in 2015, Joseph hit .234/.299/.394 with 11 HR and 49 RBI. Joseph also caught 33% of attempted base stealers, and led the pitching staff to a 3.65 ERA when he was behind the plate.

After driving in a pair of runs in a 14–8 home victory over the Kansas City Royals on September 11, 2015, Joseph would not be credited with a run batted in (RBI) in any MLB regular season game until 19 months and 18 days later. The span included the entire 2016 campaign in which he had 132 at-bats and 141 plate appearances, breaking a major-league record which was previously held by Wilbur Wood who had 96 and 124 respectively in 1971. The drought ended when he hit a two-run homer off Tommy Layne in the ninth inning of a 12–4 away loss to the Yankees on April 29, 2017.

In February 2017, the Baltimore Orioles beat Joseph in arbitration, and he was given the team's $700,000 offer (an increase from his prior salary of $523,500), instead of his $1 million request.

Joseph struggled early in the 2018 season. On May 18, the Orioles optioned Joseph to Norfolk. He became a free agent following the season.

=== Arizona Diamondbacks ===
On February 13, 2019, Joseph agreed to a one-year contract with the Arizona Diamondbacks. He made 20 appearances for the Diamondbacks during the regular season, batting .211/.250/.263 with three RBI. On December 2, Joseph was non-tendered by Arizona and became a free agent.

=== Toronto Blue Jays ===
On January 19, 2020, Joseph signed a minor league contract with the Toronto Blue Jays. On September 5, the Blue Jays selected Joseph from their taxi squad, then he was designated for assignment on September 11. Joseph elected free agency on October 15.

On February 25, 2021, Joseph agreed to a deal with the New York Mets, reportedly a split contract. On April 30, Joseph was released by the Mets without having appeared for the organization. On May 7, Joseph signed a minor league contract with the Seattle Mariners organization. He elected free agency on November 7.

== Post-playing career ==
In 2022, Joseph joined Rogers Sportsnet to serve as an analyst for Toronto Blue Jays television and radio broadcasts.

On September 19, 2022, Lipscomb University hired Joseph to the team's coaching staff to serve as the Director of Player Development.

== Personal life ==
Joseph is a Christian. Joseph and his wife, Brooke, who is from Payson, AZ, have three children. Joseph's brother, Corban, is also a baseball player and was selected in the 2008 draft by the New York Yankees in the fourth round. They played together with the Orioles in 2018. Their father, Mark, played college baseball for Lipscomb University.
