= Robert Scott (pitcher) =

American baseball player (1930–2020)

- Pitcher
- Born: June 22, 1931; Macon, Georgia, U.S.
- Died: October 11, 2020 (aged 89); Macon, Georgia, U.S.

Negro league baseball debut
- 1946, for the New York Black Yankees

Last appearance
- 1950, for the New York Black Yankees

Teams
- New York Black Yankees (1946–1950)

James Robert Scott Sr. (June 22, 1930 – October 11, 2020) was an American Negro league pitcher from 1946 to 1950.

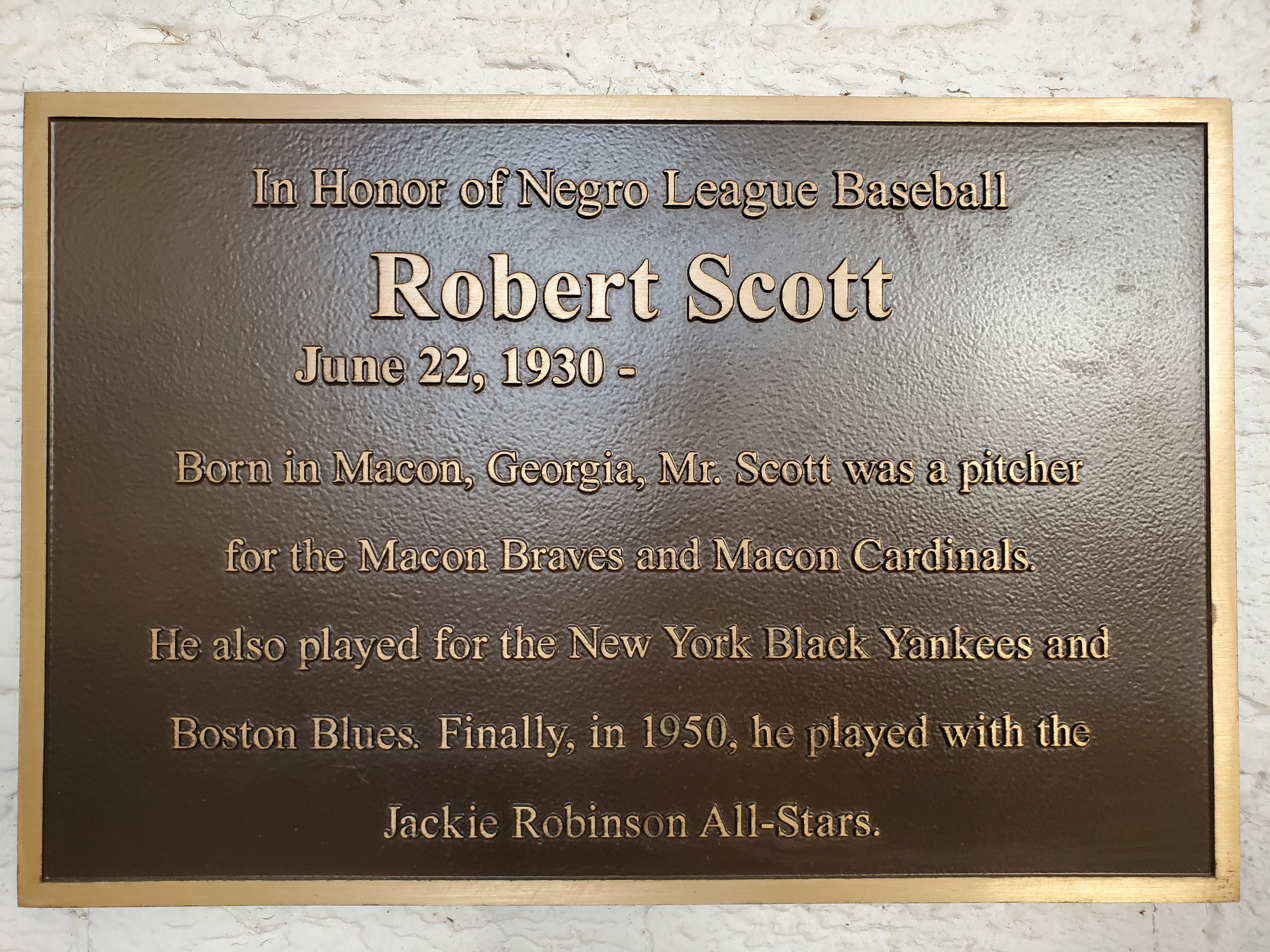
Plaque honoring Scott at Luther Williams Field in Macon, Georgia

A native of Macon, Georgia, Scott joined the New York Black Yankees as a 16-year-old in 1946, and played four seasons with the team through 1950.

Scott’s cousin arranged for a tryout when the Black Yankees played the Homestead Grays in a game at Macon’s Luther Williams Field. Scott said that he could throw “harder than a Georgia mule could kick.” He joined the team in 1946 and stayed with them until 1950, playing both as a pitcher and a first baseman. Scott’s baseball card (more on that later) says that he had a 35-25 record as a pitcher and batted .278.

In 1950, he barnstormed America as part of the Jackie Robinson All-Stars. Another one of his fondest memories was pitching against his hero, first baseman Buck Leonard. Leonard homered off of Scott, but it was a moment the pitcher didn’t forget.

After Major League Baseball became integrated, Scott signed with the Pittsburgh Pirates in 1953 by George Sisler. However, he decided to marry his wife, Mae, and focus on life outside of baseball. In 1955, he did play one season for the Sandersville Giants of the Georgia State League, which was a Class-D farm team for the New York Giants in the Georgia State League. His played 27 games and hit .186 with 1 home run, according to Baseball Reference (where he is listed as James R. Scott). Scott's roommate on the team was Willie McCovey, who was 17 years old and playing in his first season of professional baseball.

He was selected by the New York Mets in MLB's special 2008 Negro leagues draft, and was honored by the Atlanta Braves in a ceremony at Turner Field in 2016. Scott was inducted into the Macon Sports Hall of Fame in 2017, and died in Macon in 2020 at age 89.
