= Anthony Hewitt (baseball) =

American baseball player (born 1989)

- Outfielder
- Born: April 27, 1989 (age 37); Brooklyn, New York, U.S.
- Bats: Right Throws: Right
- Stats at Baseball Reference

Anthony Hewitt (born April 27, 1989) is an American former professional baseball outfielder. He was drafted by the Philadelphia Phillies in the first round of the 2008 MLB draft and spent seven seasons in the Phillies' minor league system, never reaching higher than the Double-A level.

== Early life ==
Hewitt was born in Brooklyn, New York, and attended public school there before transferring to the Salisbury School, a preparatory academy in Connecticut. Early in his life, Hewitt played basketball, but soon realized that his physique was most conducive to baseball and switched his emphasis to this sport. He was a New York Yankees fan, and "idolized" Alex Rodriguez. In high school, he played shortstop and was a strong hitter, the latter of which was the primary reason the Phillies drafted him in the first round of the 2008 MLB draft.

== Professional career ==
When the Phillies drafted Hewitt, he signed a contract that included a US$1.38 million signing bonus, as well as money to pay for eight semesters at Vanderbilt University, which Hewitt planned to attend in the offseason as a business or economics major in the hopes of learning how to manage his money. Hewitt began his career with the Gulf Coast League Phillies, the rookie affiliate of the Phillies organization, with whom he posted a .197 batting average with one home run and nine runs batted in (RBI). The next year, as a member of the Williamsport Crosscutters, Hewitt marginally improved his performance at the plate, hitting .223 with seven home runs and 30 RBI. During his first two seasons, he played third base and outfield; ultimately, the Phillies made him an outfielder. His next two years were with the Lakewood BlueClaws; in 2010, he had a "miserable" season, compiling a .202 batting average, barely above the "Mendoza Line".

He understood the "high stakes" of his 2011 season, and he bounced back somewhat, totaling 14 home runs and 36 stolen bases to supplant his .240 batting average (both of which were professional career highs). Over the first few months of the season, he even had what one writer termed a "breakout" year before a mediocre second half of the season. In 2012, he was promoted to the Clearwater Threshers, of High-A, with whom he posted a .241 batting average, 13 home runs, 50 RBI and 13 stolen bases. He was promoted once again in 2013, joining a fellow first-round pick, Jesse Biddle, with the Double-A Reading Fightin' Phils. He seemed to be on an upward spiral, finally realizing his potential; he noted that he no longer sought to live up to others' expectations, and sought to live up only to his own, which helped him relax and play with confidence, according to manager Dusty Wathan, who also praised Hewitt's incessant strong work ethic. Concurrently, Hewitt once again improved his batting average (albeit minimally, going from .241 in 2012 to .244 in 2013), and hit a career-high 16 home runs. However, the 2014 season was his last in the Phillies' organization. After a "dismal" start to the season in Reading, he was demoted to Clearwater, from which the Phillies released him on June 12, 2014 after "failing to develop in seven disappointing seasons". Corey Seidman, a writer for Comcast SportsNet, summarized Hewitt's career with the Phillies as follows:

He left high school as a shortstop, but was moved to third base and eventually the outfield by the Phillies. He struggled defensively at each position and struck out an alarming number of times at each stop. For his minor-league career, Hewitt whiffed 763 times while walking just 91. He hit .223 without enough power to make up for it. Hewitt didn't reach even High A until his fifth minor-league season in 2012 ... It closes the book on a player who stands as a symbol of the Phils' early-round draft failures over the last decade.

Following his release by the Phillies, Hewitt signed a minor league deal with the Baltimore Orioles but only played 13 games for the Orioles High-A affiliate the Frederick Keys. On March 24, 2016, Hewitt signed with the New Britain Bees of the Atlantic League of Professional Baseball, joining fellow former Phillies first round pick Greg Golson.
