= John Miles (baseball) =

Tuskegee airman and pro baseball player (1922–2013)

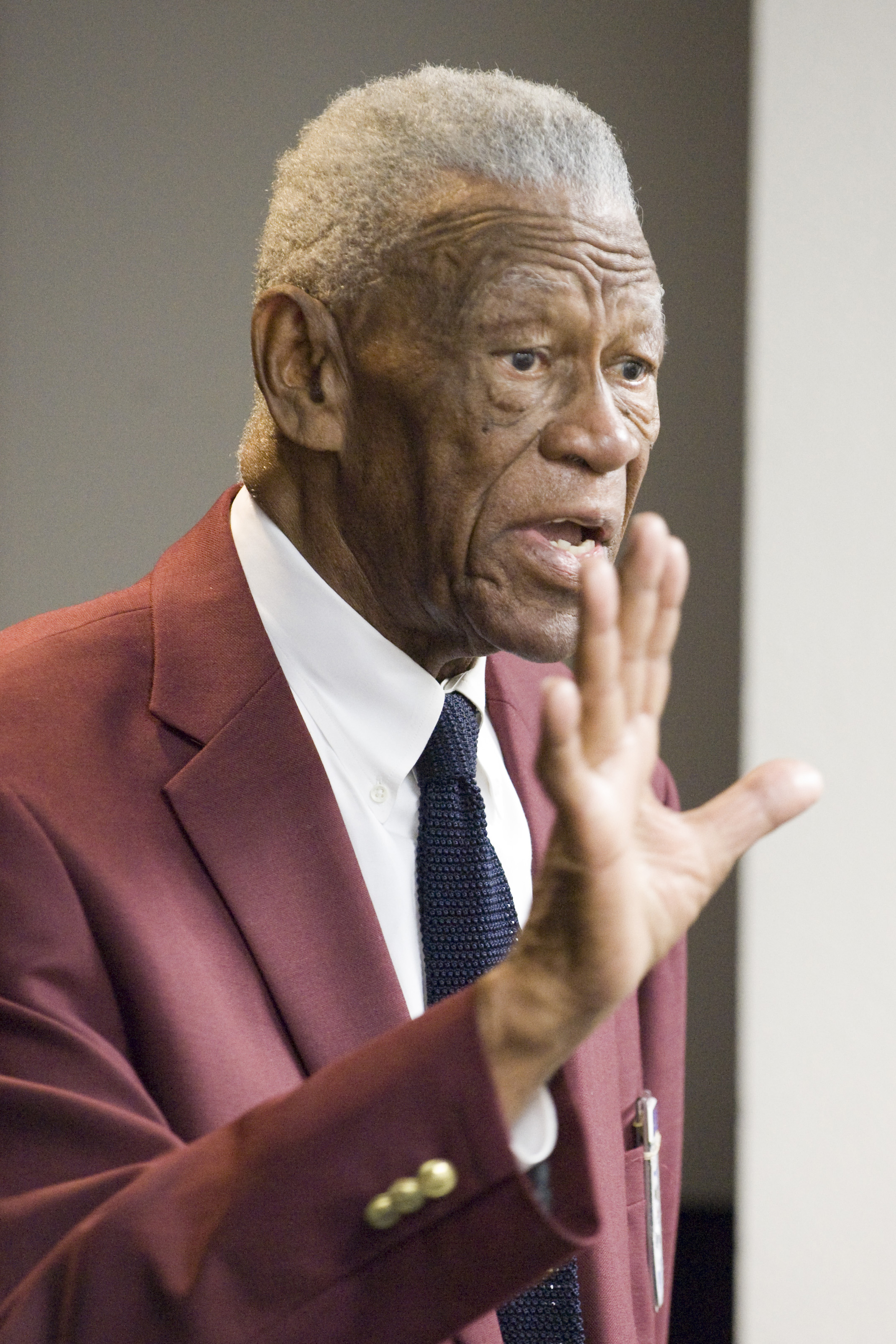
- Miles in 2010.
- Outfielder / Third Baseman
- Born: August 11, 1922; San Antonio, Texas, U.S.
- Died: 24 May 2013 (aged 90); San Antonio, Texas, U.S.
- Batted: Right Threw: Right

Teams
- Negro league teams (partial list): Chicago American Giants (1946–1949)

John "Mule" Miles (August 11, 1922 – May 24, 2013) was an American professional baseball player who played with the Chicago American Giants of the Negro leagues from 1946 to 1949. Nicknamed "the Mule" by his manager Candy Jim Taylor after hitting two home runs in one ball game. Taylor commented that Miles "hit like a mule kicks". Miles is legendary for hitting 11 home runs in 11 straight games. John Miles played alongside baseball stars Jackie Robinson, Hank Aaron, Ernie Banks, Josh Gibson, Satchel Paige and Monte Irvin. He performed at Yankee Stadium, the Polo Grounds, Comiskey Park, and Griffith Stadium among others.

Miles was inducted into the Texas Black Sports Hall of Fame in Dallas, Texas on November 4, 2000. He was inducted into the San Antonio Sports Hall of Fame at the Alamodome on February 7, 2003.

On June 5, 2008, Miles and 29 other former living Negro league players were "drafted" by each of the 30 Major League Baseball teams in a recognition of the on-field achievements and historical relevance of 30 mostly forgotten Negro league stars. He was picked by the Seattle Mariners.

In addition to his baseball career, Miles is an original Tuskegee Airman Member of the San Antonio Chapter at Randolph Air Force Base, Texas.
