= History of professional baseball in Milwaukee =

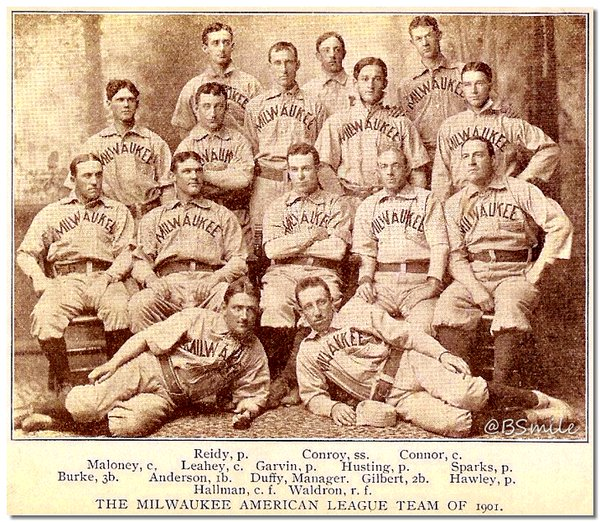
The 1901 Milwaukee Brewers of the American League

The following is a history of professional baseball in Milwaukee, Wisconsin, including its current team, the Milwaukee Brewers of Major League Baseball.

== Overview and legacy ==
Prior to the development of professional baseball, the Cream City Club of Milwaukee—commonly known as the Milwaukee Cream Citys—played in the 1860s and were quite successful. Milwaukee was an early prospect for professional baseball, with several brief experiments at the major league level but mostly in the minor leagues.

The nicknames of these teams were initially assigned by the media rather than the teams themselves. Some were known as the "Creams" or "Cream Citys" after the distinctive brick which gave Milwaukee its nickname, others were known as the "Brewers", in reference to one of the city's chief industries.

This list is a brief overview of the various Milwaukee professional baseball clubs:

=== Chronology (1876–1944) ===
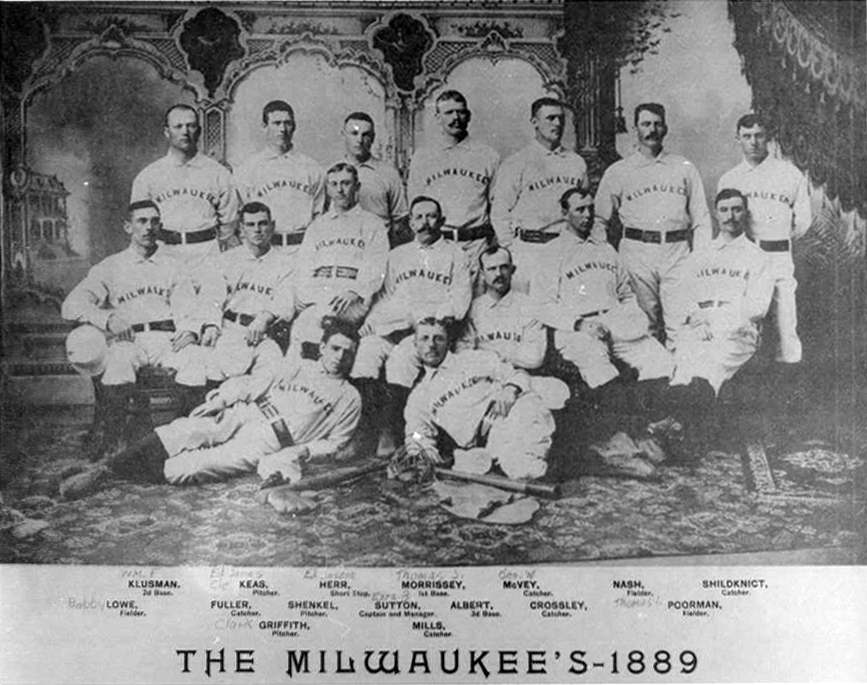
The 1889 Milwaukee Brewers (a.k.a Creams) of the Western Association

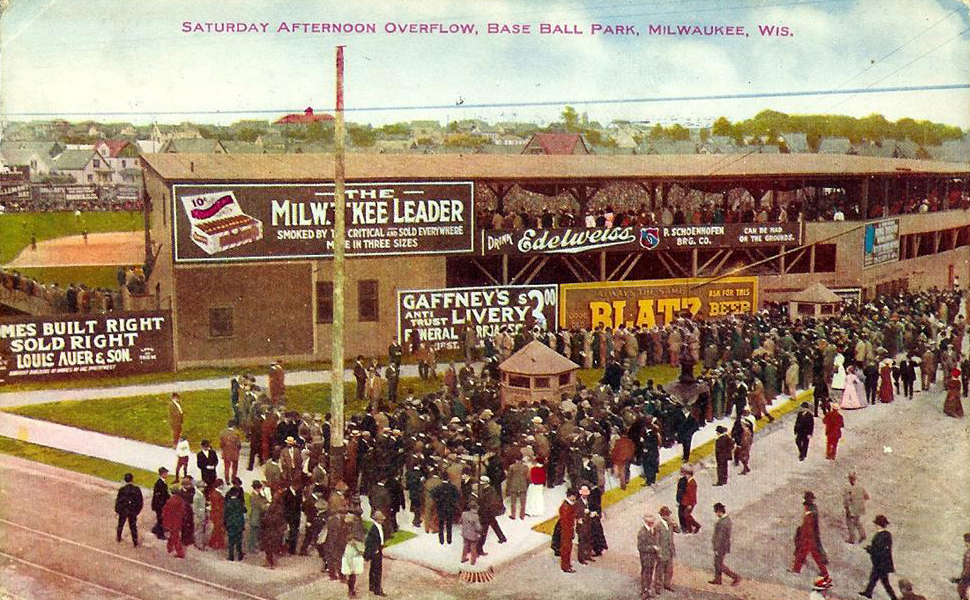
Borchert Field in 1911

- 1876–1877 Milwaukee West Ends or West End Club independent (1876), League Alliance (1877), home games at West End Grounds on "Wells Avenue, near the city limits." (Benson, p. 231).
- 1878 Milwaukee Grays a.k.a. Brewers of the National League, home games at Eclipse Park a.k.a. Milwaukee Base-Ball Grounds.
- 1879–1883 no team
- 1884–1885 Milwaukee Brewers a.k.a. Cream Citys a.k.a. Grays. Played in the Northwestern League (1884), then joined Union Association as a late-season entry, see 1884 Milwaukee Brewers season; played at Wright Street Grounds. Played in the Western League (1885) until the league disbanded in mid-June.
- 1886–1892 Milwaukee Brewers a.k.a. Cream Citys. Competed in the Northwestern League (1886–1887), played at Wright Street Grounds and, according to some sources, also at Athletic Park in 1887. Western Association (1888–1891). Joined American Association for the end of the 1891 season, replacing the Cincinnati Kelly's Killers, see 1891 Milwaukee Brewers season. Back to Western League (1892) which disbanded (later re-formed in 1894). Played at Athletic Park, later named Borchert Field and, according to some sources, also at Wright Street Grounds in 1888.
- 1894–1901 Milwaukee Brewers a.k.a Creams. Members of the Western League (1894–1899), renamed American League 1900, and became a major league in 1901; see 1901 Milwaukee Brewers season. Franchise relocated as the St. Louis Browns in 1902. Played at Athletic Park in 1894, then Lloyd Street Grounds through 1901.
- 1902–1903 Milwaukee Creams of the revived Western League, played at Lloyd Street Grounds.
- 1902–1952 Milwaukee Brewers of the American Association, played at Borchert Field.
- 1913 Milwaukee Creams of the Wisconsin–Illinois League, played at Borchert Field.
- 1923 Milwaukee Bears of the Negro National League, played at Borchert Field.
- 1928–1930 Kosciuszko Reds of the Wisconsin State League, played at Borchert Field.
- 1931–1932, 1936 Milwaukee Red Sox of the Wisconsin-Illinois League and Wisconsin State League, played at Borchert Field.
- 1944 Milwaukee Chicks of the All-American Girls Professional Baseball League.

The nickname "Brewers" has been used by Milwaukee baseball teams since at least the 1880s, although none of those clubs ever enjoyed a measure of success or stability. That would change with Milwaukee's entry into the American Association, which would last 50 years and provide the city's springboard into the major leagues.

=== Milwaukee Brewers of the American Association (1902–1952) ===
The American Association Milwaukee Brewers were founded in 1901, after the major-league Brewers of the American League moved to St. Louis and became the St. Louis Browns. The minor-league Brewers did not win their first American Association championship until 1913, then repeated the next year. Over 20 years would pass before they claimed another with a 90–64 club in 1936 as a Detroit affiliate. In 1944, the team won again, placing the team in the top 100. Three years later, the Brewers became a farm team of the Boston Braves. Although this move eventually paved the way for the team's demise, in the short run it led directly to Milwaukee's final two league championships—one in 1951 when they also won the Junior World Series, followed by an even better team the next year.

==== Bill Veeck and Jolly Cholly ====
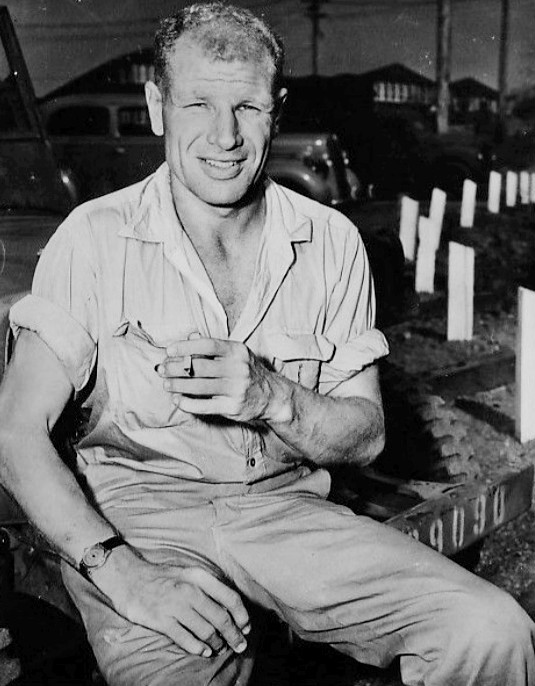
Bill Veeck in 1944

In 1941, the club was purchased by Bill Veeck (son of former Chicago Cubs president William Veeck Sr.), in a partnership with former Cubs star Charlie Grimm (nicknamed "Jolly Cholly"). Under Veeck's ownership, the Brewers would become one of the most colorful squads in baseball and Veeck would become one of the game's premiere showmen. Constantly creating new promotional gimmicks, Veeck gave away live animals, scheduled morning games for wartime night shift workers, staged weddings at home plate, and even sent Grimm a birthday cake containing a much-needed left-handed pitcher.

When Grimm was hired as the manager of the Cubs, he recommended that Casey Stengel be hired to replace him. Veeck was opposed to the idea – Stengel had little success in his previous managerial stints with the Dodgers and Braves – but as Veeck was stationed overseas in the Marine Corps, Grimm won out. The club went on to win the 1944 American Association pennant, and Stengel's managerial career was resurrected.

In 1945, after winning three pennants in five years, Veeck sold his interest in the Brewers for a $275,000 profit.

==== American Association championships ====
- 1913
- 1914
- 1936
- 1944
- 1951
- 1952

==== Junior World Series appearances ====
The Junior World Series was held between the champions of the American Association and the International League.

- 1936 – defeated Buffalo, 4 games to 1
- 1947 – defeated Syracuse, 4 games to 3
- 1951 – defeated Montreal, 4 games to 2

==== Ballpark ====
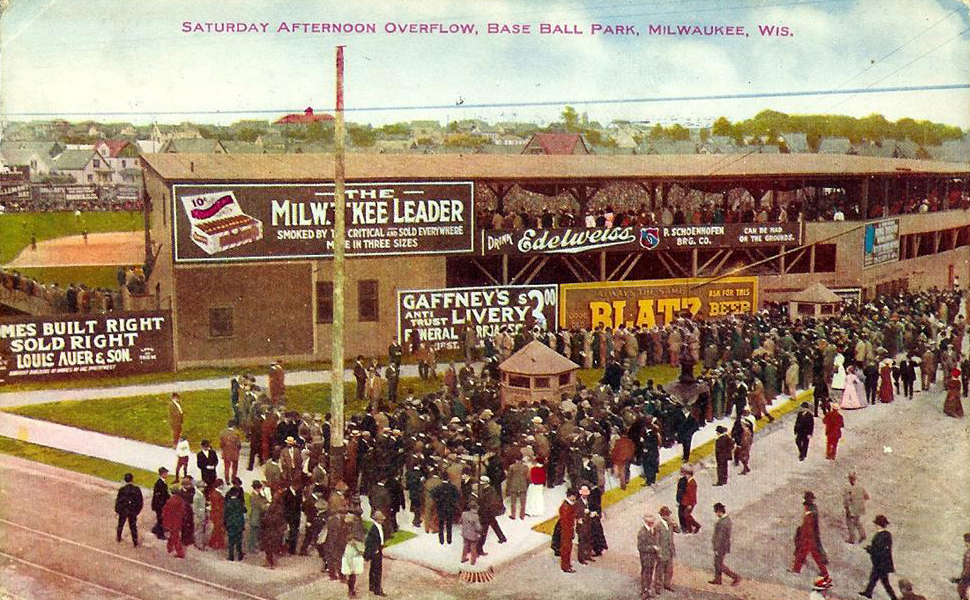
Borchert Field in a 1911 colorized postcard

During its 51-year tenure in the American Association, Milwaukee played in the same ballpark. Originally constructed in 1888, it was located in the North side of Milwaukee on a rectangular city block with the main entrance on Chambers St. between Eighth and Ninth Streets. It had abnormally short foul lines, 268 feet (82 m) to left and right. The fences then angled out sharply, making for deep "power alleys" and center field was 400 feet (120 m) from home plate. It was known as Athletic Park until 1928 when it was renamed Borchert Field in honor of Brewers owner Otto Borchert, who had died the previous year. The Polo Grounds had a similar configuration. 'Borchert Orchard' was also the first Milwaukee home park for the Green Bay Packers, who played the New York Giants on October 1, 1933. The following year, the Packers moved their Milwaukee games to the Wisconsin State Fair Grounds. Interstate 43 now runs through where Borchert Field once stood.

=== The coming of the Braves (1953–1965) ===
Milwaukee had long been coveted by major league teams looking for a new home. Bill Veeck himself tried to relocate the St. Louis Browns back to Milwaukee in the late 1940s, but his move was vetoed by the other American League owners. Eventually, they relocated to Baltimore, where they became the current edition of the Baltimore Orioles.

The city of Milwaukee, hoping both to attract a major league baseball club and also to persuade the National Football League's Green Bay Packers to move to Milwaukee full time, constructed Milwaukee County Stadium for the 1953 season. The Brewers were set to move in, until Spring training of 1953, when Lou Perini moved his Boston Braves to Milwaukee. The Brewers moved to Toledo, where they became the next incarnation of the Toledo Mud Hens. The new Mud Hens continued their winning ways, claiming an American Association pennant in their first season in Ohio.

=== The return of the Brewers (1970) ===
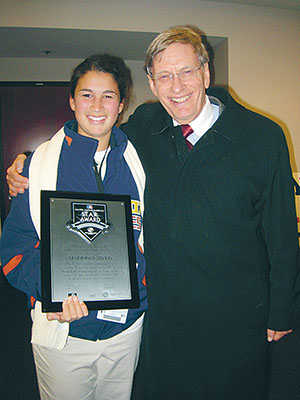
Bud Selig (right) in 2007

The legacy of the American Association Milwaukee Brewers continues in the major league Milwaukee Brewers, which took its name from the 1902–1952 club.

After the Braves moved to Atlanta in 1966, local automobile dealer and Braves part-owner Bud Selig created a group to lobby for a new major league club in Milwaukee. As a name for his group, he chose "Milwaukee Brewers Baseball Club, Inc.", after the American Association club he grew up watching. As a logo, he chose the Beer Barrel Man in navy and red – traditional Brewers colors.

When Selig bought the one-year-old Seattle Pilots franchise in the spring of 1970, he moved them to Milwaukee and they officially became the "new" major-league Milwaukee Brewers. The club continued to use the Beer Barrel Man as the team's primary logo until 1978, although due to time constraints, the team continued to use the old Pilots' colors of blue and gold. Recently, it has seen a resurgence on throwback merchandise, and been featured on several stadium promotions.

The current Brewers have played in the National League since 1998, when the franchise switched over from the American League after 29 years in the "Junior Circuit" as both the Pilots and the Brewers.

== The modern Brewers ==
=== 1966–1969: "Home of the Braves?" ===
In an effort to prevent the relocation of the Milwaukee Braves to a larger television market, Braves minority owner Bud Selig, a Milwaukee-area car dealer, formed an organization named "Teams Inc." devoted to local control of the club. He successfully prevented the majority owners of the Braves from moving the club in 1964 but was unable to do more than delay the inevitable. The Braves relocated to Atlanta after the 1965 season, and Teams Inc. turned its focus to returning Major League Baseball to Milwaukee.

Program for a 1969 Chicago White Sox game played in Milwaukee

Selig doggedly pursued this goal, attending owners meetings in the hopes of securing an expansion franchise. Selig changed the name of his group to "Milwaukee Brewers Baseball Club Inc.". The "Brewers" name, honoring Milwaukee's beer-brewing tradition, also was traditional for Milwaukee baseball teams going back into the 19th century. The city had hosted a major league team by that name in 1901, which relocated at the end of that season to become the St. Louis Browns. From 1902 through 1952, a minor league Milwaukee Brewers club in the American Association had been so successful that it lured the Braves from Boston. Selig himself had grown up watching that minor league team at Borchert Field and intended his new franchise to follow in that tradition.

To demonstrate there still was support for big-league ball in Milwaukee, Selig's group contracted with Chicago White Sox owner Arthur Allyn Jr. to host nine White Sox home games at Milwaukee County Stadium in 1968. A 1967 exhibition game between the White Sox and Minnesota Twins had attracted more than 51,000 spectators, and Selig was convinced the strong Milwaukee fan base would demonstrate the city would provide a good home for a new club.

The experiment was staggeringly successful – those nine games drew 264,297 fans. In Chicago that season, the Sox drew 539,478 fans to their remaining 72 home games. In just a handful of games, the Milwaukee crowds accounted for nearly one-third of the total attendance at White Sox games. In light of this success, Selig and Allyn agreed County Stadium would host Sox home games again the next season.

In 1969, the Sox schedule in Milwaukee was expanded to include 11 home games (one against every other franchise in the American League at the time). Although those games were attended by slightly fewer fans (198,211 fans, for an average of 18,019) they represented a greater percentage of the total White Sox attendance than the previous year – over one-third of the fans who went to Sox home games in 1969 did so at County Stadium (in the remaining 59 home dates in Chicago, the Sox drew 391,335 for an average of 6,632 per game). Selig felt this fan support lent legitimacy to his quest for a Milwaukee franchise, and he went into the 1968 owners meetings with high hopes.

Those hopes were dashed when National League franchises were awarded to San Diego (the Padres) and Montreal (the Expos), and American League franchises were awarded to Kansas City (the Royals) and Seattle (the Pilots). That last franchise, however, would figure very prominently in Selig's future.

Having failed to gain a major league franchise for Milwaukee through expansion, Selig turned his efforts to purchasing and relocating an existing club. His search began close to home, with the White Sox themselves. According to Selig, he had a handshake agreement with Allyn to purchase the Pale Hose and move them north. The American League, unwilling to surrender Chicago to the National League, vetoed the sale, and Allyn sold the franchise to his brother John.

Frustrated in these efforts, Selig shifted his focus to another American League team, the expansion Seattle Pilots.

=== 1969–1970: Roots in Seattle ===
Seattle initially had a lot going for it when it joined the American League in 1969. Like Milwaukee, Seattle had long been a hotbed for minor league baseball and was home to the Seattle Rainiers, one of the pillars of the Pacific Coast League (PCL). The Cleveland Indians had almost moved to Seattle in the early 1960s. Many of the same things that attracted the Indians made Seattle a plum choice for an expansion team. Seattle was the third-biggest metropolitan area on the West Coast (behind Los Angeles and the San Francisco Bay Area). The addition of a third team on the West Coast also would balance out the addition of Kansas City. Also, there was no real competition from other pro teams. While Seattle had just landed the NBA's SuperSonics, the NBA was not in the same class as baseball was in terms of popularity at the time.

The front man for the franchise was Dewey Soriano, a former Rainiers pitcher and general manager and former president of the PCL. In an ominous sign of things to come, Soriano had to ask William R. Daley, who had owned the Indians at the time they flirted with Seattle, to furnish much of the expansion fee. In return, Daley bought 47 percent of the stock—the largest stake in the club. He became chairman of the board while Soriano served as president.

However, a couple of factors were beyond the Pilots' control. They (alongside with the Montreal Expos, San Diego Padres and Kansas City Royals) were originally not set to start play until 1971. But the date was moved up to 1969 under pressure from Sen. Stuart Symington of Missouri. Professional baseball had been played in Kansas City for all but two years in the 20th century until the A's left for Oakland after the 1967 season, and the prospect of having Kansas City wait three years for its return was not acceptable to Symington. Also, the Pilots had to pay the PCL US$1 million (equivalent to $10 million in 2025) to compensate for the loss of one of its most successful franchises. After King County voters approved a bond for a domed stadium (what would become the Kingdome, which opened in 1976) in 1968, the Seattle Pilots were officially born. California Angels executive Marvin Milkes was hired as general manager, and St. Louis Cardinals coach Joe Schultz became manager.

To the surprise of no one outside Seattle (Schultz and Milkes actually thought they could finish third in the newly formed AL West), the Pilots were terrible. They won their very first game, and then their home opener three days later, but only won five more times in the first month. Despite this, Schultz managed to keep his patchwork team competitive for much of the early part of the season; they were within striking distance of .500 for much of the spring, and were actually six games out of first as late as June 28. However, a 9–20 record in July ended any realistic hope of contention, and a 6–20 record in August crumbled them to last place for good. They finished with a record of 64–98, 33 games out of first.

However, the team's poor play was the least of its troubles. The most obvious problem was Sick's Stadium. The longtime home of the Rainiers, it had been considered one of the best ballparks in minor league baseball. By the 1960s, however, it was considered far behind the times. While a condition of MLB awarding the Pilots to Seattle was that Sick's had to be expanded to 30,000 seats by the start of the 1969 season, only 17,000 seats were ready due to numerous delays. The scoreboard was not ready until the eve of opening day. While it was expanded to 25,000 by June, the added seats had obstructed views. Water pressure was almost nonexistent after the seventh inning, especially with crowds above 10,000. Attendance was so poor (678,000) that the Pilots were almost out of money by the end of the season. The team's new stadium was slated to be built at the Seattle Center, but a petition by stadium opponents ground the project to a halt. By the end of the season, it was obvious that the Pilots would not survive long enough to move to their new stadium without new ownership. It was also obvious that the move would have to happen quickly, as Sick's Stadium was completely inadequate even for temporary use.

During the offseason, Soriano crossed paths with Selig. They met in secret for over a month after the end of the season, and during Game 1 of the World Series, Soriano agreed to sell the Pilots to Selig for US$10 to $13 million (equivalent to $110 million in 2025), depending on the source.

Selig would then move the team to Milwaukee and rename it the Brewers. However, the owners turned it down in the face of pressure from Washington's two senators, Warren Magnuson and Henry (Scoop) Jackson, as well as state attorney general Slade Gorton. MLB asked Soriano and Daley to find a local buyer. Local theater chain owner Fred Danz came forward in October 1969 with a $10 million deal (equivalent to $90 million in 2025), but it fizzled when the Bank of California called in a $4 million loan (equivalent to $40 million in 2025) it had made to Soriano and Daley for startup costs.

In January 1970, Westin Hotels owner Eddie Carlson put together a nonprofit group to buy the team. However, the owners rejected the idea almost out of hand, since it would have devalued the other clubs' worth. A more traditional deal came one vote short of approval.

After a winter and spring full of court action, the Pilots reported for spring training under new manager Dave Bristol unsure of where they would play. The owners had given tentative approval to the Milwaukee group, but the state of Washington got an injunction on March 17 to stop the deal. Soriano immediately filed for bankruptcy – a move intended to forestall any post-sale legal action. At the bankruptcy hearing a week later, Milkes testified there was not enough money to pay the coaches, players and office staff. Had Milkes been more than 10 days late in paying the players, they would have all become free agents and left Seattle without a team for the 1970 season. With this in mind, Federal Bankruptcy Referee Sidney C. Volinn declared the Pilots bankrupt on March 31—seven days before Opening Day—clearing the way for them to move to Milwaukee. The team's equipment had been sitting in Provo, Utah with the drivers awaiting word on whether to drive toward Seattle or Milwaukee.

Much of the story of the Seattle Pilots' only year in existence is told in Jim Bouton's classic baseball book Ball Four (1970).

After a lawsuit from the City of Seattle, King County, and the State of Washington was filed against the American League for breach of contract, the Pilots were eventually replaced by another expansion team, the Seattle Mariners, who began play in 1977.

=== 1970–1977: Early years in Milwaukee ===
With final approval to move to Milwaukee coming less than a week before Opening Day, Selig's efforts to promote the team were significantly hamstrung. The most visible evidence was in the uniforms. Selig's original intention had been to adopt navy and red as the team colors, hearkening back to the minor league club (souvenir buttons sold at White Sox games at County Stadium featured the major league club's logo in that color combination). However, due to the late start, the club was forced to make do with the Pilots' blue and gold palette. That color combination, in various shades, is still used by the club. With no time to order new uniforms, the club had to remove the Pilots logo from team uniforms and replace them with Brewers logos. In fact, the outline of the old Pilots logo could still be seen on the Brewers' uniforms. The short notice (along with their geographical location) also forced the Brewers to assume the Pilots' old place in the AL West. While this resulted in natural rivalries with the White Sox and Twins, it also meant the Brewers faced some of the longest road trips in baseball, traveling to the Angels and Athletics for three series each per season.

Under the circumstances, the Brewers' 1970 season was over before it started, and they finished 65–97. They would not have a winning season until 1978.

Selig brought back former Milwaukee Braves catcher (and fan favorite) Del Crandall in 1972 to manage the club. In 1972, the Brewers were shifted to the AL East when the second edition of the Washington Senators moved to Arlington, Texas and became the Texas Rangers.

It was during this period that Milwaukee County Stadium gained its reputation for fun as well as baseball. Then-team vice president Dick Hackett hired Frank Charles to play the Wurlitzer organ during the games, and Hackett introduced team mascots Bernie and Bonnie Brewer.

On November 2, 1974, the Brewers orchestrated a trade that brought one of the most beloved Braves back to Milwaukee, sending outfielder Dave May and a player to be named later (minor league pitcher Roger Alexander) to Atlanta for Hank Aaron. Although not the player he was in his prime, Aaron brought prestige to the young club, and the opportunity to be a designated hitter allowed Aaron to extend his playing career two more seasons.

=== 1978–1983: The glory years of Bambi's Bombers and Harvey's Wallbangers ===
Following the 1977 season, the Brewers made two big hires that turned the previously underachieving Brewers into perennial contenders. Harry Dalton was hired as the club's general manager and he, in turn, hired Baltimore Orioles pitching coach George Bamberger as the Brewers' third manager in their brief history. Bamberger immediately turned the Brewers into pennant contenders in 1978. The team won 93 games, an astonishing 26 game improvement from the previous season. The Brewers finished in third place in the AL East, 6.5 games behind the first place New York Yankees. Dalton built a winning club with a combination of home-grown players like Robin Yount, Paul Molitor, and Gorman Thomas, as well as getting players that were cast-offs from other teams that became major contributors like Cecil Cooper, Ben Oglivie, and Mike Caldwell.

The next season, Milwaukee won 95 games and finished second in the East behind the Baltimore Orioles on the strength of their home run power, led by Oglivie (who led the league in homers in 1980 along with Reggie Jackson), Cooper, and Thomas (who hit a then club-record 45 home runs in 1979, since surpassed by Prince Fielder's 50 homers in 2007). Because of the team's slugging ability and the nickname of their manager Bamberger, the Brewers were nicknamed "Bambi's Bombers".

As 1980 began, the Brewers and their fans were optimistic about becoming pennant winners, but the team scuffled during the season, partially due to Bamberger suffering a heart attack and having to be replaced by Buck Rodgers. The Brewers fell back to third place in 1980, largely due to the lack of an effective bullpen. Determined to get a proven relief pitcher, general manager Dalton made a huge offseason trade with the St. Louis Cardinals, sending outfielder Sixto Lezcano and three minor league pitchers to the Cardinals in exchange for Rollie Fingers, Pete Vuckovich, and Ted Simmons, all of whom became key parts of the Brewers future success.

The Brewers won the second half of the 1981 season (divided because of a players' strike) and played the Yankees in a playoff mini-series they ultimately lost. It was the first playoff appearance for the franchise. Rollie Fingers had one of the greatest seasons for a relief pitcher that season, saving 28 games in the shortened season and sporting an astonishing 1.04 ERA, earning him both the MVP and Cy Young Awards in the American League.

In 1982, the Brewers were considered heavy favorites to win the AL East, but by June, the team had fallen to 23–24 and signs had shown that the players were having problems playing under manager Buck Rodgers. Taking a gamble, the Brewers fired Rodgers and replaced him with hitting coach Harvey Kuenn. The team immediately excelled under Kuenn's low-key managerial style and gained a new nickname as Harvey's Wallbangers, a play on the drink Harvey Wallbanger and the team's manager's name. The Brewers went 72–43 under Kuenn for the rest of the season and went wild offensively, clubbing a then club-record 216 home runs during the season. The Brewers alone had three players finish in the top five in the league in home runs with Gorman Thomas, who led the league with 39, Ben Oglivie, who hit 34, and Cecil Cooper, who hit 32. Late in the season, to try to ensure the Brewers' pennant chase, the team made one last trade on August 30 for Don Sutton. That trade would become even more important on the final game of the regular season between the Brewers and the Baltimore Orioles, with both teams tied for first place in the AL East. Don Sutton started against Jim Palmer and the Brewers won 10–2, thanks to Robin Yount hitting two clutch home runs, clinching the AL East Division. The Brewers finished the season 95–67, the best record in baseball that year.

The Brewers faced the California Angels in the 1982 American League Championship Series and lost the first two games in California, but then rallied to win the next two games back in Milwaukee, setting up the pivotal Game 5, with the winner being the American League Champions. Down 3–2 in the 7th, Cecil Cooper hit a clutch 2-run single to put the Brewers on top and proved to be a game winner. The Brewers became the first team to win the American League Championship Series when down two games to none.

The Brewers then played the St. Louis Cardinals in the World Series, which was seen as a match-up of contrasting playing styles, as the Cardinals' offensive style was speed and defense, whereas the Brewers' offense was power hitting. Affectionately called "The Sud-Way series, wordplay for subway series and parodying the two cities as homes of major breweries (Miller Brewing Company in Milwaukee and Anheuser-Busch in St. Louis) the Brew Crew won Game One 10–0, thanks to Paul Molitor's World Series record 5 hits and a complete game shutout by Mike Caldwell. The Cardinals won the next two games and seemed to have Game 4 in complete control until the Brewers rallied for six runs in the 7th to win the game 7–5. The Brewers then won Game Five 6–4, giving them a 3–2 series lead, but the Cardinals trounced Don Sutton winning Game 6 13–1, and rallied for three runs late in Game 7 to win the Series, 4 games to 3. Many point to the lack of a bullpen for their downfall, as the Brewers had the lead in five of the seven games. Ace closer Rollie Fingers missed the playoffs due to a torn muscle in his throwing arm that not only kept him out for the entire playoffs but also would have him miss the entire 1983 season.

The Brewers had many individual accomplishments during their two playoff years, as both in 1981 and 1982, Brewer players won both the AL MVP and Cy Young Awards, with Rollie Fingers winning both awards in 1981, and Robin Yount winning the MVP and Pete Vuckovich winning the Cy Young in 1982.

The Brewers were in contention to repeat in 1983, but the team fell on a rough September to finish in 4th place with an 87–75 record, their last winning season until 1987. Part of the reason for the Brewers' fall in 1983 was the absence of three main parts of their pennant-winning club the year before. Rollie Fingers was lost for the whole season with a torn muscle in his throwing arm, beloved slugger Gorman Thomas struggled badly offensively and was traded to the Cleveland Indians, and their ace, Pete Vuckovich, was revealed to have had a torn rotator cuff that had been plaguing him since 1981 and only pitched in 5 games in 1983. Two milestones were reached by Brewers players in 1983, however, when Don Sutton got his 3,000th career strikeout and Ted Simmons got his 2,000th career hit. Harvey Kuenn resigned as manager after the season.

=== 1984–1993: Rollercoaster, riding the highs and lows ===
Following their two playoff years, the club quickly retreated to the bottom of the standings, never finishing higher than fifth (out of seven) in their division from 1984 to 1986. Hope was restored in 1987 when, guided by rookie manager Tom Trebelhorn, the team began the year with a 13-game winning streak. Unfortunately, they followed that hot start with a 12-game skid in May. But "Team Streak" eventually posted a strong third-place finish. Highlights of the year included Paul Molitor's 39-game hitting streak and what is still the only lone pitcher no-hitter in team history, pitched by Juan Nieves on April 15.

On that day, Nieves became the first (and so far, only) Brewer and first Puerto Rican-born Major Leaguer to pitch a no-hitter, defeating the Baltimore Orioles 7–0 at Memorial Stadium. The final out came on a climactic diving catch in right-center field by Robin Yount of a line drive hit by Eddie Murray. The game also was the first time the Orioles were no-hit at Memorial Stadium. Yount later recalled at a Brewers banquet that he did not have to dive to catch the line drive hit by Murray but figured ending the game with a diving catch would be the icing on the cake for Nieves' no-hitter. Part of the Brewers' resurgence came from cultivating a new crop of young stars in their farm system, like pitchers Teddy Higuera and Dan Plesac, and position players B.J. Surhoff, Dale Sveum, and Rob Deer.

In 1988 the team had another strong season, finishing only two games out of first (albeit with a lesser record than the previous year) in a close playoff race with four other clubs. Following this year, the team slipped, posting mediocre records from 1989 through 1991, after which Trebelhorn was fired. In 1992, reminiscent of the resurgence which greeted Trebelhorn's arrival in 1987, the Brewers rallied behind the leadership of rookie manager Phil Garner and posted their best record since their World Series year in 1982, finishing the season 92–70 and in second place, four games behind that year's eventual World Champion Toronto Blue Jays. As a bit of a shocker for Brewers fans, who were used to the team sporting several power hitters, the Brewers in 1992 instead led the American League with 256 stolen bases, while hitting only 82 home runs, with only two players (Greg Vaughn and Paul Molitor) hitting more than 12 for the year. Despite not making the playoffs, the Brewers had some other memorable moments, as Pat Listach hit .290 and stole 54 bases while winning the AL Rookie of the Year award, while Robin Yount got his 3000th career hit. 1992 proved to be the end of an era for the Brewers, as teammates Robin Yount, Paul Molitor, and Jim Gantner, who had been together since 1978, would go their separate ways, as Molitor left the Brewers for the Toronto Blue Jays, Gantner retired, and Yount would only last one more season before retiring in 1993.

The hope of additional pennant races was quickly dashed, as the club plummeted to the bottom of the standings in 1993, finishing an abysmal 26 games out of first. Since 1992, highlights were few and far between as the franchise failed to produce a winning season, having not fielded a competitive team because of a combination of bad management and financial constraints that limit the team relative to the resources available to other, larger-market clubs.

As the 1990s came to a close, the Brewers were on their way to becoming a perennial doormat. A lack of good management and an aging ballpark in old County Stadium, were both becoming stark problems for the Brewers and many fans began to wonder if the Brewers would ever become contenders again.

=== 1994–1998: Taking it National ===
In 1994, Major League Baseball adopted a new, expanded playoff system. This change would necessitate a restructuring of each league from two divisions into three. The Brewers were transferred from the old AL East division to the newly created AL Central. (Due to the baseball strike, however, the new-look playoffs and World Series did not materialize that year.)

In March 1995, two new franchises—the Arizona Diamondbacks and Tampa Bay Devil Rays—were awarded by Major League Baseball, to begin play in 1998. It was decided to add one new team to each league. At the time, however, MLB did not want to have an odd number of teams per league because they would either have to give teams many more off-days than in the past, interleague play would have to be extended year-round, or both (in 2013, however, the realignment of the Houston Astros from the National to American League gave both an odd number of teams, necessitating year-round interleague play). For MLB officials to continue the existing schedule, where teams play almost every day and where interleague play is limited to a few days per year, both leagues would need to carry an even number of teams. The decision was made to have one existing club switch leagues.

This realignment was widely considered to have great financial benefit to the club moving. However, to avoid the appearance of a conflict of interest, Commissioner (then club owner) Bud Selig decided another team should have the first chance to switch leagues. The Kansas City Royals of the American League's Central Division were asked first, but they decided not to move over to the National League's Central Division. The choice then fell to the Brewers, who, on November 6, 1997, elected to move to the National League's Central Division. At the same time, the Detroit Tigers agreed to move from the AL East to the AL Central (to replace Milwaukee). The Tampa Bay Devil Rays joined the AL East and the Arizona Diamondbacks joined the NL West. Had the Brewers elected not to move to the National League, the Minnesota Twins would have been offered the opportunity next.

Milwaukee had formerly been a National League town, having been the home of the Braves for 13 seasons (1953–1965) until their relocation to Atlanta. With the Brewers having joined the National League, their pitchers would be forced to bat with the NL not adopting the designated hitter at the time of the move. The Brewers would resume playing with a DH full-time in 2020 and from 2022 onward after the NL officially adopted the rule.

=== 1999–2003: Building Miller Park ===
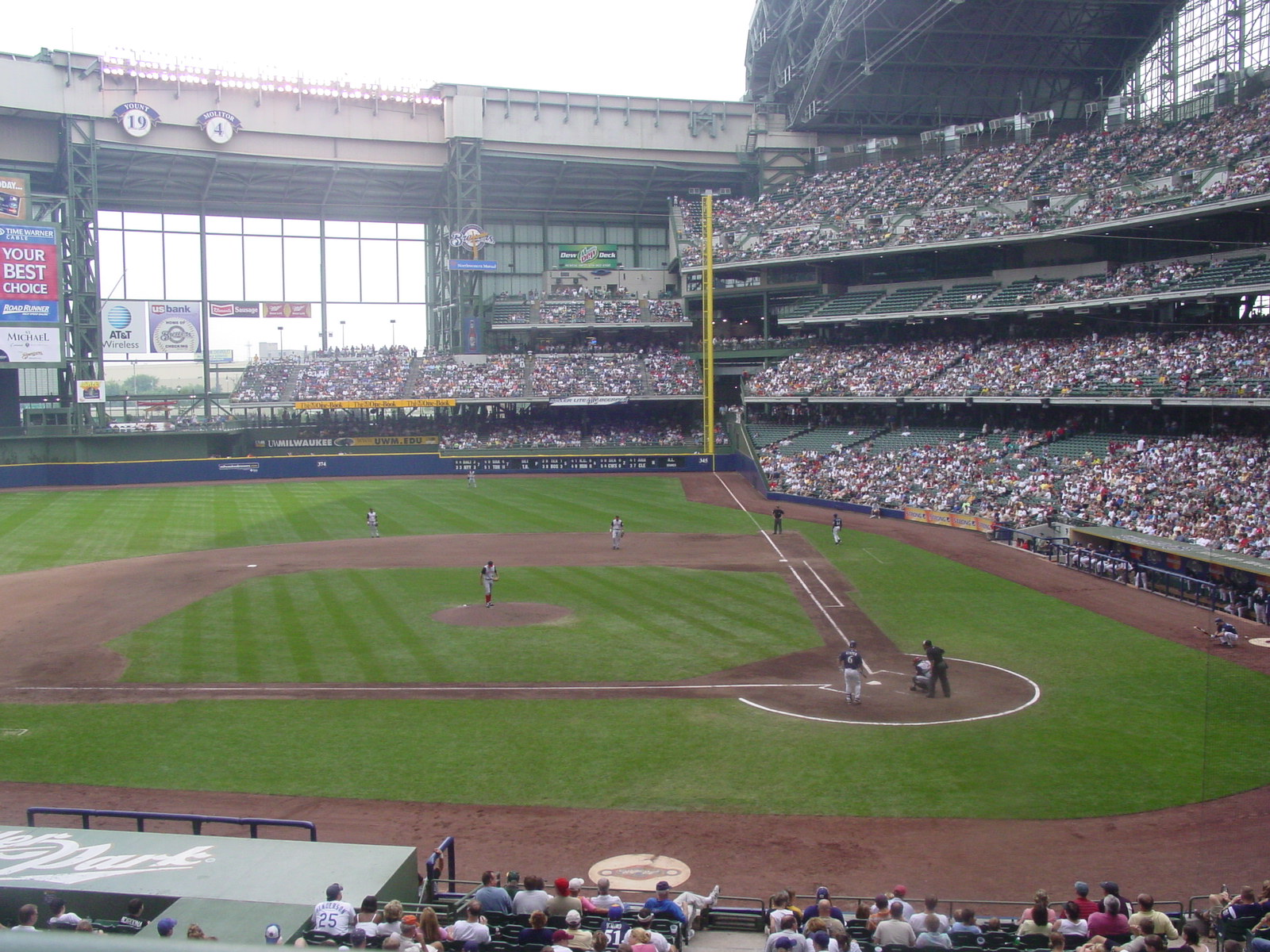
American Family Field (formerly Miller Park from 2001 to 2021), the current home of the Milwaukee Brewers.

As early as 1993, Brewers owner Bud Selig had talked of a new ballpark for the Brewers to replace Milwaukee County Stadium, which had become heavily outdated and antiquated and did not have luxury suites.

By 1996, the club was set to build a new ballpark near the site of County Stadium, which would have a retractable roof to counter the unpredictable Wisconsin weather in the spring and autumn. It also helped to bring more fans and their families from all around Wisconsin to come to games with a practical guarantee of no rain-outs, bring in more potential revenue for the club.

The future American Family Field was opened as "Miller Park" in 2001, built to replace Milwaukee County Stadium. The stadium was built with US$310 million of public funds (equivalent to $560 million in 2025), which drew some controversy at the time. It is the only sporting facility in the United States to have a fan-shaped retractable roof. Miller Park has a seating capacity of 41,900, along with standing room of 43,000, which is 10,000 fewer seats than County Stadium. In 2021, the stadium was renamed to "American Family Field".

The park was to have opened a year earlier, but an accident during its construction that resulted in the deaths of three workers forced a year's delay and incurred US$50 to $75 million in damage. On July 14, 1999, the three men lost their lives when the Lampson "Big Blue" crane, one of the largest in the world, collapsed while trying to lift a 400-short-ton (360 t) right field roof panel. A statue commemorating the men now stands between the home plate entrance to Miller Park and Helfaer Field.

The Brewers made renovations to Miller Park before the 2006 campaign, adding both LED scoreboards from Daktronics, a company in Brookings, South Dakota, in left field and on the second-tier of the stadium, as well as a picnic area in right field, shortening the distance of the right-field fence. The picnic area was an immediate hit and sold out for the season before the year began.

The ballpark has featured another fan favorite, The Racing Sausages, in a race of five costumed mascots, held before the bottom of the sixth inning.

While the Brewers' new park was a hit, the club itself was not successful playing in it, as the Brewers finished the season even worse than their previous seasons, going 68–94 in their first season at Miller Park. The Brewers finished 2002 even worse, finishing with a dismal 56–106 record, 41 games out of first place, the worst record in franchise history.

In 2003, the Brewers hired Doug Melvin as general manager, who in turn brought in Ned Yost, coach with the Atlanta Braves and a former member of the 1982 American League Champion Brewers, as manager. Though the Brewers only went 68–94 in 2003, the Brewers did raise hopes with a winning record in August during the season.

=== 2004–present: Attanasio era ===
==== 2004–2006: Building a winner ====
On January 16, 2004, Selig announced that his ownership group was putting the team up for sale, to the great relief of many fans who were unhappy with the team's lackluster performance and poor management by his daughter, Wendy Selig-Prieb, over the previous decade. In September 2004, the Brewers announced they had reached a verbal agreement with Los Angeles investment banker Mark Attanasio to purchase the team for a reported US$223 million. The sale to Attanasio was completed on January 13, 2005, at Major League Baseball's quarterly owners meeting. Other members of Attanasio's ownership group include private equity investor John Canning Jr., David Uihlein, Harris Turer and Stephen Marcus, all of whom were involved with the previous ownership group led by Major League Baseball commissioner Bud Selig. Since taking over the franchise, Attanasio has worked hard to build bridges with Milwaukee baseball fans, including giving away every seat to the final home game of 2005 free of charge and bringing back the classic "ball and glove" logo of the club's glory days on "Retro Friday" home games, during which they also wear versions of the team's old pinstriped uniforms.

The Brewers caused a stir in the first half of the 2004 season, when the team had a winning record in the first half of the season, even briefly being in 1st place in the NL Central. However, lack of a productive offense doomed the Brewers and the club sunk back to last place, finishing the season 67–94. The Brewers did have some bright moments during the season with pitcher Ben Sheets striking out 18 Atlanta Braves in one game and the Brewers coming back from a 9-run deficit to beat the Cincinnati Reds.

After the 2004 season, with Mark Attanasio now in control of the franchise, the Brewers were finally able to spend some money on free agents. The Brewers first significant free-agent signing in many years was veteran catcher Damian Miller, a Wisconsin native, and to address a need for better run production, the Brewers traded speedy outfielder Scott Podsednik and relief pitcher Luis Vizcaíno to the Chicago White Sox in exchange for slugging outfielder Carlos Lee. The arrival of Lee gave Brewer fans even higher hopes that better seasons were on the way for the Brewers.

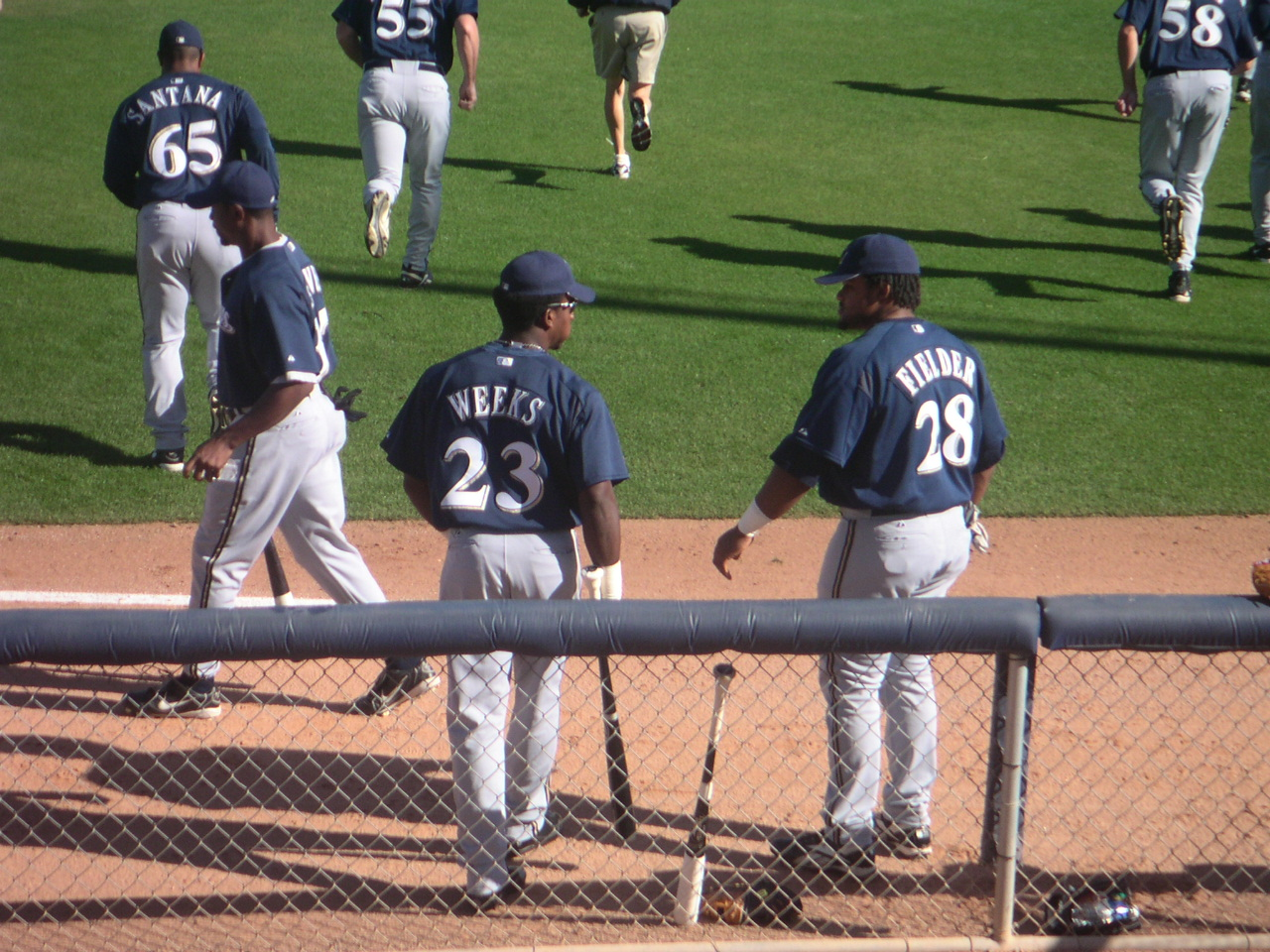
Rickie Weeks and Prince Fielder at Spring training, 2005

In 2005, under Attanasio's ownership, the team finished 81–81 to secure its first non-losing record since 1992. Carlos Lee provided the Brewers with much needed run support, hitting 32 home runs and driving in 112. Starting pitcher Chris Capuano also had a stellar season, going 18–12 with a 3.99 ERA, the most wins by a Brewer pitcher since Pete Vuckovich won 18 games in 1982.

With a base of young players assembled over five years, including Prince Fielder, Rickie Weeks, J. J. Hardy and Corey Hart, the Brewers improved. The Brewers hired former players for the Brewers: Robin Yount (bench coach; resigned in November 2006) and Dale Sveum (third base coach).

In 2006, the Brewers' play disappointed fans, players, and management. They began the season 5–1 and had a 14–11 record at the end of April. On Mother's Day Bill Hall hit a walk off home run with his mother in the stands, a play that was shown on ESPN throughout the summer. However, soon starters JJ Hardy, Rickie Weeks, and Corey Koskie were lost to injuries, and the Brewers were forced to trade for veteran infielders David Bell and Tony Graffanino. They also suffered setbacks when losing starting pitchers Ben Sheets and Tomo Ohka for a substantial amount of time, forcing Triple A starters Ben Hendrickson, Dana Eveland, Carlos Villanueva, and Zach Jackson into starting roles at different points in the year. Shortly before the All Star break the Brewers climbed to one game above .500, but then lost their next three to the Chicago Cubs and would never return to .500. After the All Star break closer Derrick Turnbow blew four straight save opportunities. This led to the Brewers being far enough down in the standings that management decided to trade free agent-to-be Carlos Lee to the Texas Rangers for closer Francisco Cordero, outfielder Kevin Mench, and two minor league prospects. Cordero replaced Turnbow as the Brewers closer and had immediate success, converting his first 13 save opportunities. On August 24 the Brewers completed a sweep of the Colorado Rockies to climb to less than five games out in both the NL Central Division and NL Wild Card races, but then Milwaukee went on a 10-game losing streak that ended any postseason hope. The Brewers did rebound and play well in September including a four-game sweep of San Francisco, but it was too little too late. The Brewers ended the season with a 75–87 record.

At the end of the season, Attanasio stated that he and general manager Doug Melvin would have to make some decisions about returning players for the 2007 season. With young players waiting in the minor leagues, during the off-season the key additions were starting pitcher and 2006 NLCS MVP Jeff Suppan, starter Claudio Vargas, reliever Greg Aquino, catcher Johnny Estrada, and returning Brewer Craig Counsell. The Brewers parted ways with 2006 starters Doug Davis and Tomo Ohka, as well as fan favorite Jeff Cirillo, who wanted more playing time with another team.

==== 2007-2010: The return to respectability and to the postseason ====
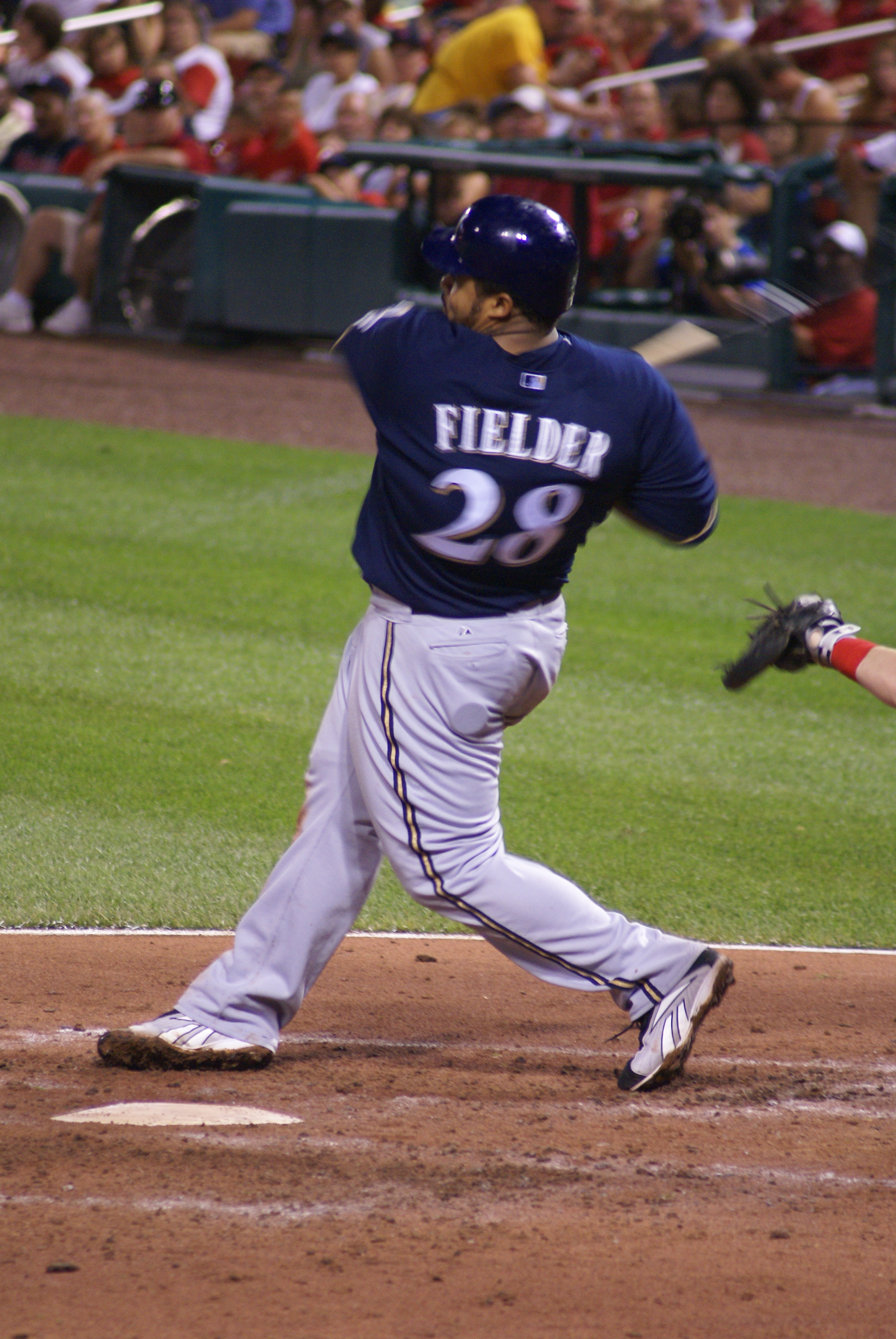
Prince Fielder

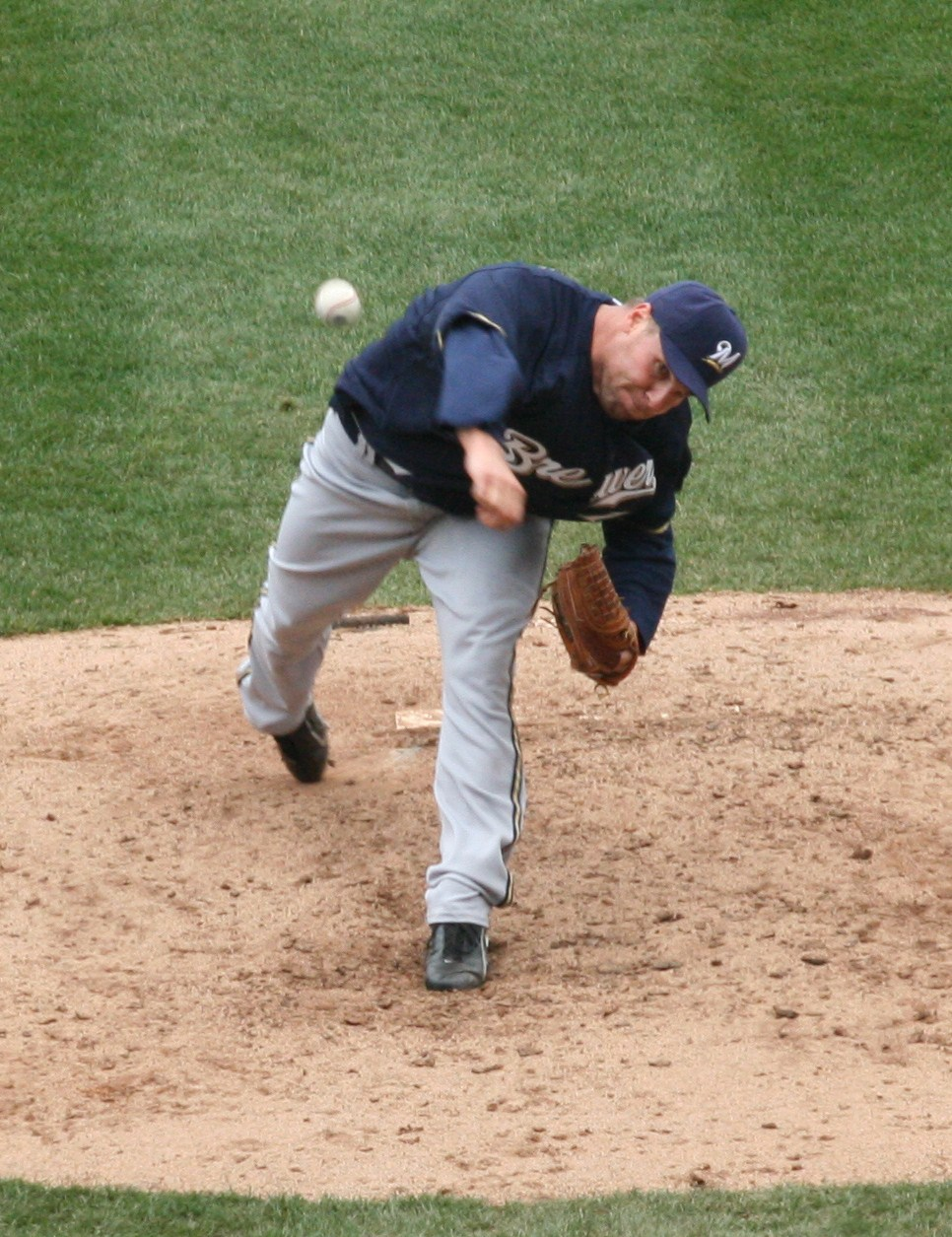
Ben Sheets

Before the 2007 season, the buzz surrounding the Brewers greatly increased. They were dubbed a "sleeper team" and "contenders in the NL" by numerous sports analysts and magazines. ESPN's Peter Gammons and Dan Patrick both picked The Brewers to beat out the defending champion Cardinals and re-vamped Chicago Cubs to win the NL Central. To celebrate the successful 1982 Milwaukee Brewers team, the franchise decided to have the 2007 season be named as the "25th Anniversary of '82", with more fan giveaways than any other Major League Baseball team except the Pittsburgh Pirates, and more discounts and deals than any other time in Brewers' history.

ESPN.com's lead story on August 29 stated: "... Then there are the Brewers. The strange, impossible-to-figure-out Brewers. They once had the best record in the majors, were 14 games over .500 twice, and led the division by as many as 8½ games on June 23. Since then, and there's no nice way of saying it; they've reeked." The Brewers cast this negativity to the side, and rebounded in September. Despite poor performances from the usually steady Chris Capuano and more nagging injuries to Ben Sheets, the Brewers found themselves in a heated pennant race with Chicago's North Siders. The team's playoff drive took a hit late in the year, however, losing three of four games in a crucial series in Atlanta, dropping the Brewers to a season-high 3.5 games out of first. The Brewers won the first two games of their final homestand of the season to pull within two games of the Cubs, but faced a near impossible task with the club's elimination number down to only three and the wild card leading Padres coming to town. The club played well, but the Cubs clinched on the final Friday of the season. On September 29 the Brewers beat Padres 4–3 in extra innings to secure a winning season. The game was tied in the ninth inning by a triple by Tony Gwynn Jr. in a highlight reel play that was repeated often during the 2007 post season. That win, and the win the next day, by the Brewers kept the Padres from advancing to the playoffs. The irony, of course, being that Gwynn's father was arguably the most popular Padre of all-time, and Tony Gwynn Jr. would later be traded to the Padres in 2009. Milwaukee finished at a respectable 83–79, only two games behind Chicago, the club's best finish since 1992. First baseman Prince Fielder made history in 2007, becoming the first Brewer and the youngest player ever to reach the 50 home run mark in a single season. For his effort, he finished third in the 2007 National League Most Valuable Player voting, garnering 284 total points including 5 first place votes. Fielder was also awarded the Hank Aaron Award for reaching the amazing single year record. Third baseman Ryan Braun was also rewarded for his historic season by being named 2007 NL Rookie of the Year.

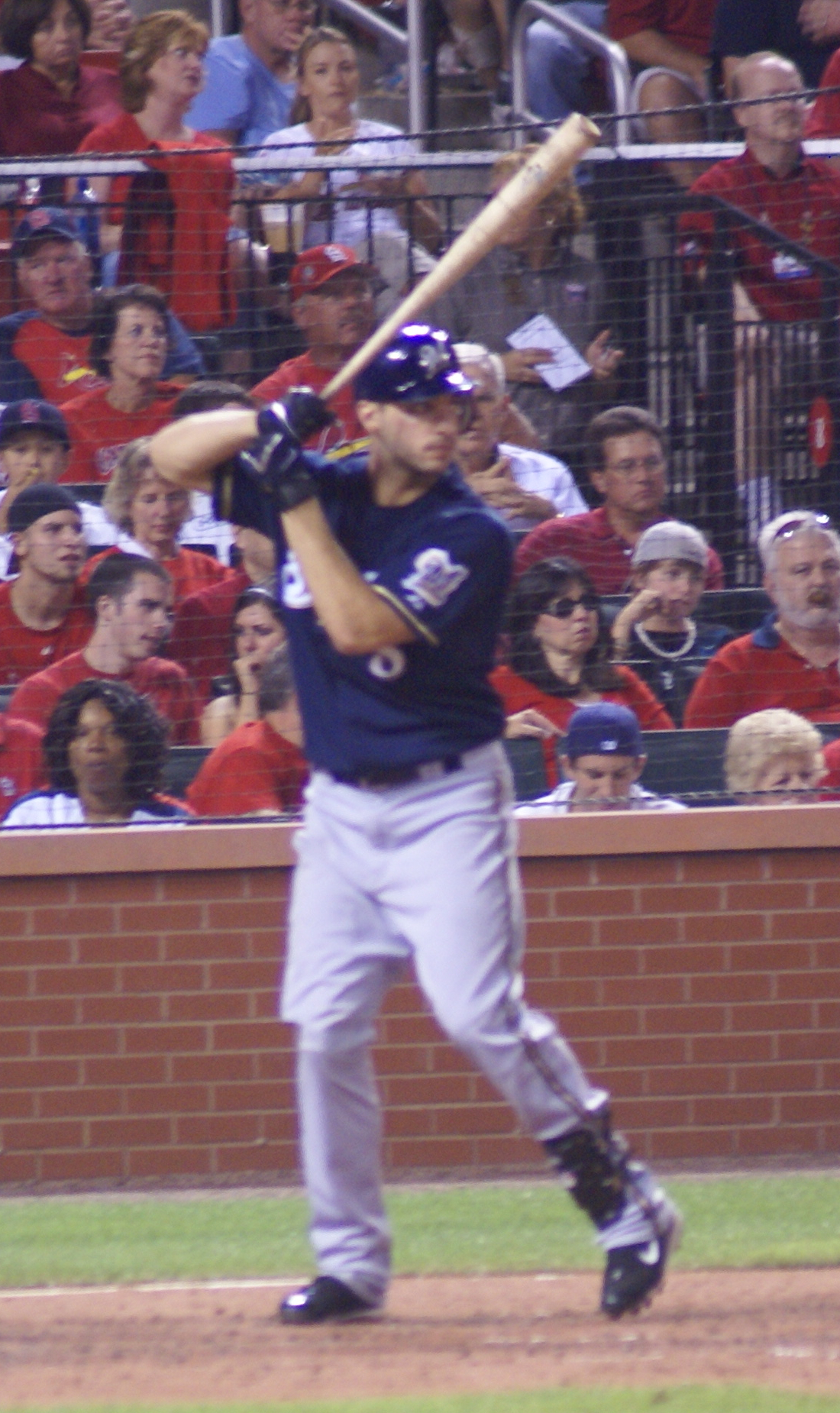
Ryan Braun, 2008

The Brewers came into 2008 with hopes of ending the team's 26-year playoff drought, adding several veterans to the team in outfielder Mike Cameron and catcher Jason Kendall, as well as relief pitchers Éric Gagné and Salomón Torres. The Brewers started April on a solid winning note, but suffered two big blows in their pitching rotation when Dave Bush was demoted to AAA Nashville, and Yovani Gallardo suffered a potential season ending knee injury. The team dropped below .500 by the middle of May, capped off by a sweep from the Boston Red Sox.

The Brewers rebounded in June as Salomón Torres took over as closer, becoming a big success, and soon climbed back into contention. As June came to a close, the Brewers made their biggest move for playoff contention as they traded four prospects, most notably Matt LaPorta, to the Cleveland Indians for CC Sabathia. general manager Doug Melvin summed up the trade by saying, "We are going for it." The Brewers came into the All-Star break with a 52–43 record, still third behind the Cubs and Cardinals. Ben Sheets was named starting pitcher for the National League in the All-Star game, and Ryan Braun also started at left field. Corey Hart was named to the team in the Final Vote.

The Brewers came out of the All-Star break with a bang as they won their first seven games back, all of them on the road, sweeping first the Giants and then the Cardinals, taking over first place in the Wild Card standings. The Brewers came into the end of July still in the hunt for the division, but the front running Cubs swept the Brewers in a four-game set at Miller Park. While the Brewers were still holding on to the Wild Card lead, the division was never seriously challenged for the remainder of the year.

The Brewers came off the sweep from the Cubs with an amazing August, winning 20 of 28 games in the month. Sabathia made history by becoming the first pitcher in over 90 years to win his first 9 games after being traded mid-season. With a steady five game lead for the Wild Card, the hope of a playoff spot seemed secured, but the Brewers struggled in September, first getting swept by the New York Mets, and then just over a week later, getting swept in four games by the Philadelphia Phillies, losing their lead in the Wild Card. Feeling a change was needed, the Brewers fired manager Ned Yost with just 12 games left in the season, replacing him with Brewers third base coach Dale Sveum. Sveum named Garth Iorg as his replacement as third base coach, and made Robin Yount the new bench coach, replacing Ted Simmons. With the final 6x games at home, the Brewers were still in the hunt for the Wild Card behind the New York Mets. They first swept the Pittsburgh Pirates, thanks to walk-off home runs by Prince Fielder and Ryan Braun, tying the New York Mets for the Wild Card lead with 3 games to go against the NL Central division champion Chicago Cubs.

The Brewers took the first game thanks to a pinch-hit home run by Rickie Weeks and stellar relief pitching by Seth McClung. The Cubs took the second game, with the Wild Card race still in a dead tie. CC Sabathia was called to pitch his third game in a week, and was stellar, pitching a complete game, while Ryan Braun hit possibly the biggest home run in club history with a 2-run shot in the 8th inning to break a 1–1 tie. The Brewers won 3–1 while the New York Mets lost to the Florida Marlins 4–2, sealing the Brewers the Wild Card spot.

The Brewers finished the 2008 season one game ahead of the New York Mets in the wild card race with a final record of 90–72, and faced the Philadelphia Phillies in the NLDS. This was the first time the Brewers reached the playoffs since 1982.

The Brewers played their first postseason game in 26 years on October 1. Pitcher Yovani Gallardo made his first postseason start and only his second start since coming off the disabled list in late September. The Brewers lost the first game of the NLDS 3–1 on a dominant performance by Phillies pitcher Cole Hamels. Hamels allowed only two hits and struck out nine Brewers batters in eight shutout innings. The Brewers mounted a comeback in the 9th inning as closer Brad Lidge allowed two hits, a walk, and a run to score. However, Brewers right fielder Corey Hart struck out with runners on second and third to end the game.

The Brewers hosted Game 3, which was the first playoff game ever hosted at Miller Park and the first in Milwaukee since Game 5 of the 1982 World Series. The Brewers won, but were eliminated in Game 4, ending the Brewers season while the Phillies went on to win the World Series.

During the off-season, the Brewers lost C.C. Sabathia when he filed for free agency and signed a lucrative deal with the New York Yankees. Despite the loss of a starting pitcher in Sabathia, the Brewers were able to sign all-time save leader Trevor Hoffman. The Brewers were not able to build on their success from the year prior falling below .500 but were witness to Prince Fielder setting the all-time franchise record for RBI.

The Brewers attempted to shore up their starting pitching with the signing of free agent Doug Davis, but the Brewers still struggled. After just one month, the Brewers released Jeff Suppan, Doug Davis got injured, and Trevor Hoffman struggled to get saves. The only bright spots of the season was the Brewers' hitting. The Brewers were the only team in baseball to have three players with 100+ RBIs in Ryan Braun, Casey McGehee, and Corey Hart. The Brewers lost 9 games in a row in May and never fully recovered, finishing the season 77–85, which was good for 3rd place in the National League Central division, behind the Cincinnati Reds and the St. Louis Cardinals. The only other bright spots of the season was Trevor Hoffman getting his 600th career save and the emergence of new closer John Axford. After the season, the Brewers chose not to renew the contract of manager Ken Macha. In October, just days after the World Series, the Brewers hired Ron Roenicke, bench coach of the Los Angeles Angels, to be the Brewers' new manager.

==== 2011 season: NL Central champs ====
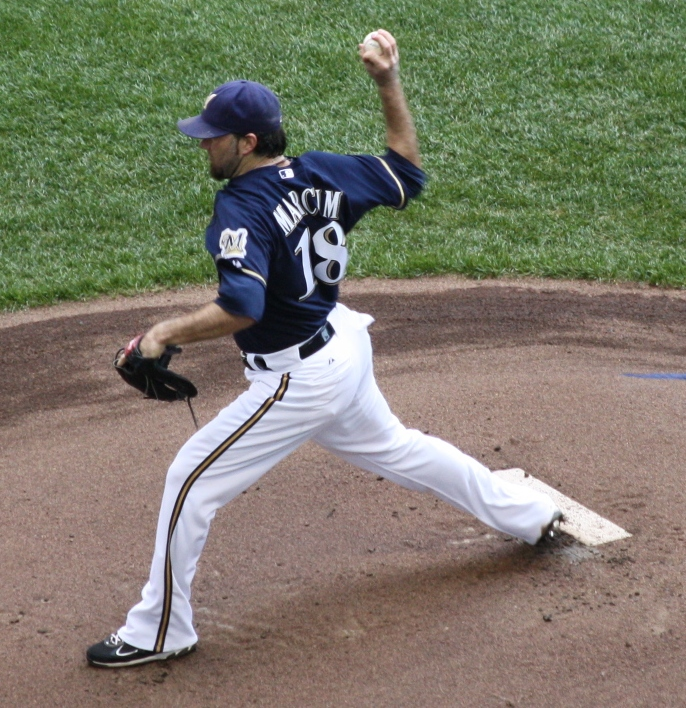
Shaun Marcum, 2011

With the trades for Shaun Marcum and Zack Greinke, the Brewers were tabbed by many experts as favorites to not only win the NL Central Division, but also contenders for the National League pennant. The Brewers did suffer some early losses in spring training, as Zack Greinke was lost to a rib injury that would keep him out for a month, and Corey Hart was out for the first half of April with a hamstring injury, which caused the Brewers to make a last-minute trade at the end of spring training for Washington Nationals outfielder Nyjer Morgan.

The Brewers struggled during the first month of the season, losing their first 4 games of the season and fell as far down as to 5th place in the NL Central Division, but the Brewers rebounded starting at the end of May and throughout June and early July. By the All-Star Break, the Brewers were in 2nd place in the division, behind Pittsburgh and St. Louis. To address some needed bullpen depth, the Brewers made a shocking trade just hours after the All-Star Game, trading two Class-A prospects to the New York Mets for ace reliever Francisco Rodriguez, who immediately became the Brewers set-up reliever for closer John Axford.

The Brewers went on a hot winning stretch through the month of August and by the beginning of September were 10 1/2 games ahead of St. Louis for the NL Central lead. Though the Brewers scuffled some in September, the Brewers clinched the division on September 26, beating the Florida Marlins 4–1. The Brewers finished the season with a 96–66 record, the best record in franchise history.

Along with their team accomplishments, the Brewers had many individual achievements from their players. Ryan Braun finished the season with 33 homers and 33 steals while finishing second in the National League in batting average, hitting .332 while Prince Fielder finished second in the league in both home runs and RBIs, hitting 38 home runs while driving in 120.

The Brewers starting pitching was also drastically better than 2010. Each of the Brewers 5 regular starters had 10-plus wins during the regular season. Yovani Gallardo won 17 games, the most by a Brewer since 2005, Zack Greinke won 16 games despite missing one month, both Shawn Marcum and Randy Wolf won 13 games, and number five starter Chris Narveson won 11 games. It was the first time since 1982 that the Brewers had five pitchers with 10 or more wins in a season. The Brewers also used fewer starting pitchers than any team in baseball, using only six starting pitchers, with Marco Estrada filling in for 7 games when Greinke and later Narveson were out with injuries.

The Brewers faced the NL West Champion Arizona Diamondbacks in the NLDS and won the first two games at Miller Park, with Yovani Gallardo pitching 8 stellar innings in a 4–1 Game 1 win. The Diamondbacks won games 3 and 4 in Arizona, setting up a deciding Game 5 back in Miller Park. The Brewers had a 2–1 lead going into the 9th inning when closer John Axford blew his first save since April, giving up the lead. The Brewers went on to win the game and the series in the 10th inning on a base hit by Nyjer Morgan driving in Carlos Gomez for the winning run. The Brewers faced their divisional foe and the NL Wild Card winner, the St. Louis Cardinals, who had upset the favored Philadelphia Phillies in the NLDS. Many Brewers fans welcomed facing the Cardinals with the National League pennant at stake, with the Brewers and Cardinals having a growing rivalry, and also a chance for the Brewers to avenge their 1982 World Series defeat, which was at the hands of the Cardinals. The two teams split the first two games at Miller Park, then the Cardinals took two out of 3 games at Busch Stadium and won Game 6 to win the National League pennant and eventually the World Series against the Texas Rangers. Probably the biggest reason for the Brewers' defeat was the downfall of their starting pitching. In their 11 postseason games, the Brewers' starting pitchers only had three quality starts, with Yovani Gallardo accounting for two of them, both of which were in the NLDS. The other quality start was Randy Wolf in Game 4 of the NLCS.

==== 2012–2014: A step back ====
In the offseason, the Brewers would lose many of their spot players that had helped them during the season, such as Mark Kotsay, Jerry Hairston Jr., and Craig Counsell but their most notable loss was that of Prince Fielder, who would leave the team via free agency after having been a part of the Brewers organization for almost a decade. Fielder would end up signing with the Detroit Tigers. The Brewers would make two significant free agent signings during the off-season, signing shortstop Alex Gonzalez and third baseman Aramis Ramierez to improve the left side of the Brewers infield. The Brewers would also sign Japanese outfielder Norichika Aoki to bring some needed outfield depth.

The biggest news of all during the off-season, though, was the issue of the reigning NL MVP Ryan Braun apparently testing positive for PED's and facing a possible 50-game suspension. Braun would appeal the suspension and won on the basis that the test was not processed properly, making him the first player to win an appeal against a suspension regarding illegal substances.

Despite the offseason losses and controversies, the Brewers fans still looked forward to the 2012 season with great optimism, as the Brewers, by the end of February, had sold over 1.5 million tickets, the most before the month of March. However, the Brewers started the season poorly, with a 40–45 record by the All-Star break. Poor bullpen play put the team even further out of contention by the end of July, which caused the Brewers to trade ace pitcher Zack Greinke to the Los Angeles Angels of Anaheim in exchange for top minor league shortstop Jean Segura and two minor league relief pitchers.

Suddenly, in mid-August, the Brewers went on a run to put themselves back in postseason contention. The bullpen started to turn itself around and the team was able to get production from several minor league call-ups, like Mike Fiers, Martin Maldonado, Jeff Bianchi, and Wily Peralta. Combined with stellar hitting of Ryan Braun, Aramis Ramírez, Corey Hart, and Jonathan Lucroy, the Brewers, from August 16 to September 23, won 26 of 35 games. However, the Brewers were eliminated from postseason contention on September 30, a 7–0 loss to the Houston Astros.

The Brewers still finished with a winning record in 2012, going 83–79, finishing in 3rd place in the NL Central behind Cincinnati and St. Louis.

The Brewers hoped to become contenders again in 2013, and tried to shore up their starting pitching with the signing of free-agent Kyle Lohse, but the Brewers, after starting off well with a 14–11 record in April, fell flat with a 6–22 mark in May, and never regained momentum, finishing the season 74–88.

Further compounding the Brewers' fall during the season were nagging injuries to Aramis Ramírez, and also Ryan Braun's supposed involvement with the Biogenesis scandal, which resulted in Braun being suspended for the final 60 games of the regular season after he admitted to taking PEDs during the 2011 playoffs. Major League Baseball did not force Braun to surrender his 2011 National League MVP award.

On the field, the Brewers did have several individual performances that gave fans some hope for the coming seasons. Shortstop Jean Segura finished second in the National League with 44 stolen bases, and Carlos Gomez had a breakout season, batting .284 with 24 home runs, 40 stolen bases, and became the first Brewer since 1982 to win a Gold Glove award for his defensive play, and catcher Jonathan Lucroy had a stellar offensive season, hitting 18 home runs and driving in 82 RBIs.

Few experts considered the Brewers as contenders in the NL Central for 2014, even after the Brewers signed another free-agent starting pitcher in Matt Garza; most expected the Brewers to finish no better than 4th in the division. The team also improved their bullpen with resigning Francisco Rodriguez as closer, trading outfielder Nori Aoki to the Kansas City Royals in exchange for a young pitcher in Will Smith, and signing veteran slugging first baseman Mark Reynolds.

The Brewers started the season hot, going 20–7 in April, much to the surprise of many. The Brewers showed much improved starting pitching, with a steady rotation in Yovani Gallardo, Kyle Lohse, Matt Garza, Wily Peralta, and Marco Estrada. In addition, Francisco Rodriguez regained his old form, successfully closing out his first 17 saves of the season, and Will Smith became virtually untouchable, sporting a 0.88 ERA in the first two months of the season.

Though the Brewers showed some struggles in the months of May and July, the team continued to stay on top of the standings as one of the better teams in the National League, helped by an 18–10 record in June. By mid September, however, they had lost their division lead to the St. Louis Cardinals and were trailing behind the Pittsburgh Pirates in the National League Wild Card race.

The Brewers were in first place in the division from April 5 to September 1, but ultimately finished third in the division after a sub-.500 September, barely getting over .500 with an 82–80 record.

A couple of standout performers for the Brewers came from Jonathon Lucroy, who finished with a .301 batting average and led the National League with 53 doubles and set a new Major League record for doubles by a catcher in a season with 48. Second-year pitcher Wily Peralta had a 17–11 record, while Kyle Lohse had a 13–9 record with 2 complete-game shutouts.

==== 2015–2017: A new rebuild ====
The offseason for the Brewers was relatively quiet, with only a couple of trades made where the Brewers parted with two starting pitchers. Marco Estrada was traded to the Toronto Blue Jays for first baseman Adam Lind, and Yovani Gallardo, after 8 seasons with the Brewers and becoming the franchise's all-time strikeout leader, was traded to the Texas Rangers. During the offseason, Ryan Braun, who had his worst season ever during 2014 (.266 avg., 19 HR, and 81 RBI's), had surgery on his right thumb, which had bothered him all during the season and was thought to be the reason behind his dismal numbers. On the field, the Brewers' season went south almost immediately, going 5–17 in the month of April. On May 4, manager Ron Roenicke was fired and Craig Counsell was named interim manager, staying manager for the Brewers through the rest of the season, as the team finished 68–94.

The Brewers began a mode of rebuilding the team, with Doug Melvin stepping down as general manager and being replaced by Houston Astros assistant GM, David Stearns. Stearns kept interim manager Craig Counsell, making him the Brewers' full-time manager, and traded away over half of the Brewers' 40-man roster from 2015 before the 2016 season came to a close. The Brewers finished the 2016 season with a 73–89 record, but had a 41–40 record at home, and had two players lead the National League in major offensive categories, with infielder Jonathan Villar leading the NL, and all of Major League Baseball, with 62 stolen bases, and first baseman Chris Carter tied for the NL lead in home runs, with 41. Ryan Braun also had a rebound season, with a .305 batting average, 30 home runs, 91 RBIs, and 16 stolen bases. The Brewers also traded away many franchise stars in exchange for prospects, such as Jonathan Lucroy and Carlos Gomez, and other starters, with the exception of Ryan Braun.

The Brewers came into 2017 with minimal expectations other than continuing their rebuilding of the team. The team surprised many by finishing the month of April at .500, with encouraging performances from Eric Thames, Chase Anderson, Jesus Aguilar, and Travis Shaw. The Brewers continued to stay around .500 for the next two months, and took advantage of the struggles of the Cubs and Cardinals, and started July with a hot 7–2 start, putting the Brewers at 50–41 for the season, 5.5 games ahead of the Cubs in the NL Central at the All-Star break. The Brewers struggled after the All-Star break, going 3–11 for the rest of July, followed by a 6-game losing streak in the middle of August. The Brewers still stayed in the race for the Wild Card game, but fell short of the postseason and the NL Central Division, with an 86–76 record, which still was a surprise for many in the baseball community.

==== 2018–2023: Back to Contention ====
With the opportunity to build off their surprising 2017 run, Brewers GM David Stearns worked on stocking up the Brewers roster for 2018, including signing pitchers Jhoulys Chacin and Junior Guerra, and outfielder Lorenzo Cain, who had originally started his MLB career in Milwaukee. The Brewers also traded for another outfielder, Christian Yelich, for four minor leaguers. The Brewers started 2018 well, helped by a stretch in May where they went 19–8 to put themselves on top in the NL Central division, taking advantage, once again, of early struggles for both the Cubs and Cardinals. However, the team struggled again in the middle of the season, going 40–39 through the months of June, July, and August. However, they were still in the playoff hunt, leading in the Wild Card, but were still 5 games behind the division-leading Cubs going into the final month of the season. The Brewers got hot again, going 19–7 in September, including winning 10 of their last 11 games, the last 8 in a row, to catch the Cubs. Christian Yelich led the offense, going on an offensive tear, including hitting clutch home runs in two of the final three games of the season against the Detroit Tigers. The Brewers tied the Cubs for the NL Central lead, resulting in a one-game playoff for the division title. The Brewers won 3–1, clinching their second division title of the decade, and only their 3rd in franchise history, finishing with a 96–67 record, tying the franchise record for wins in a season. The Brewers continued their hot run in the NLDS, against the Colorado Rockies, sweeping them in three games to advance to the NLCS, also achieving at least 12 wins in a row for only the second time in their history. The Brewers faced the Los Angeles Dodgers in the NLCS, but the Brewers were unable to keep their late momentum, as the Dodgers bullpen was able to quiet the Brewers' bats, winning the National League pennant in seven games.

Following their amazing 2018 campaign, GM David Stearns worked on adding more talent to the Brewers roster, including signing free agent catcher Yasmani Grandal and third baseman Mike Moustakas, each on one-year contracts. The Brewers headed into the month of September with an overall record of 69–66, being four games behind the Cubs for the second wild card spot and trailing the Cardinals by six and a half games for the division lead. On September 25, the Brewers beat the Cincinnati Reds 9–2 to clinch a postseason spot for the sixth time in franchise history, knocking the Cubs out of playoff contention. It was also the first time the Brewers had made the postseason for a consecutive season since 1982. But in their final three regular season games, they were swept by the Colorado Rockies at Coors Field, which led to the Brewers finishing 20–7 in September, 89–73 for the regular season, and finishing two games behind the NL Central Champion Cardinals. They ended up taking the second spot in the wild card. Therefore, the Brewers faced the eventual World Series champion Washington Nationals in the NL Wild Card Game in Washington D.C., where they lost 4–3.

After a frustrating end to the season, the Brewers lost some key players in the offseason. Free agent Yasmani Grandal signed with the Chicago White Sox, Eric Thames signed with the Washington Nationals, and third baseman Mike Moustakas signed with the Cincinnati Reds. Their biggest move was extending former MVP Christian Yelich to a 9-year $215 million deal. Due to the COVID-19 pandemic, the 2020 season was shortened to 60 games and did not begin until late July. For the 2020 season, MLB expanded to a 16-game postseason with all teams playing in the first round. Brewers finished the season 29–31 tied with the San Francisco Giants, but the Brewers had a better record against their division opponents, which made them eligible for the last spot in the playoffs. In the first round of the playoffs, the Brewers faced the Los Angeles Dodgers, who swept them in two games and went on to win the 2020 World Series.

With a 4-game postseason losing streak, David Stearns helped out the infield by signing Kolten Wong and Travis Shaw. He tried signing third baseman Justin Turner but he extended with the Dodgers. During the season, Milwaukee Bucks superstar Giannis Antetokounmpo joined the Brewers ownership group.

In 2021, the Brewers earned their fourth consecutive postseason berth, winning the National League Central with a 95–67 record. Pitcher Corbin Burnes set an all-time record by starting the season with 58 strikeouts without issuing a walk. He also led the major leagues in ERA (2.43), strikeouts per nine innings (12.6), home runs per nine innings (0.4), and strikeout-to-walk ratio (6.88). For his amazing season, Burnes won the NL Cy Young Award. Josh Hader was another hardware recipient, becoming the Major League Baseball Reliever of the Year Award winner in the National League for the third time in four years. For the third straight season, the Brewers were eliminated in the postseason by the eventual World Series champions, as they lost the NLDS to the Atlanta Braves. General manager David Stearns would announce he was stepping away from the role, taking on the new role of president of baseball operations, and promoting Matt Arnold to general manager.

The Brewers' winning ways continued through the first half of the 2022 season. On July 30, the team had a four-game lead in the National League Central. However, the Brewers then lost 21 of their next 35 games to fall 9 1/2 games behind the St. Louis Cardinals. The Brewers were eliminated on October 3, missing the postseason for the first time in five years. Before the trade deadline, the Brewers traded closer Josh Hader, who struggled in June and July, to the San Diego Padres in exchange for prospects, including pitcher Robert Gasser, and Padres closer Taylor Rogers. After the season, David Stearns went to the New York Mets, where he became president of baseball operations.

The Brewers rebounded in 2023, with closer Devin Williams replacing Hader and providing a stellar stat line, going 8–3 with a 1.53 ERA and 38 saves. During the Winter Meetings, the Brewers took part in a 3-way trade with the Oakland Athletics and Atlanta Braves that got the Brewers catcher William Contreras from the Braves. Contreras would go on to bat .289 with 17 home runs and 78 RBI's, winning the NL Silver Slugger Award at the catcher's position. The Brewers went 92–70, good enough to win the NL Central division title. However, with the new MLB playoff format, the Brewers had to play in the Wild Card round against the Arizona Diamondbacks in a best-of-three series. The Diamondbacks would win both games, eliminating the Brewers.

Manager Craig Counsell's contract expired at the end of the 2023 season, and with his strong winning record, he was expected to become the highest-paid manager in MLB. While the Brewers offered Counsell a contract that would've made him the highest-paid manager in baseball, Counsell turned down the Brewers and a larger contract offer from the New York Mets to instead sign with the Brewers' biggest rival, the Chicago Cubs. This decision was seen as a massive betrayal by Brewers fans, given Counsell had a long history of growing up in Milwaukee and being a big fan and fixture in Milwaukee. After Counsell signed with the Cubs, in subsequent visits to Milwaukee, Brewers fans would relentlessly boo him every time he appeared. Counsell's former bench coach, Pat Murphy, was named the new manager of the Brewers to replace Counsell.

During the off-season, the Brewers traded ace pitcher Corbin Burnes, who was in the final year of his contract, to the Baltimore Orioles in exchange for top prospects, pitcher D.L. Hall and infielder Joey Ortiz. They would also sign top outfield prospect Jackson Chourio to an 8-year, $80 million contract, making him the highest-paid player to not have yet made an official MLB appearance. The team would also sign first baseman Rhys Hoskins, who was coming off a bad injury that took him out of baseball for a whole season.

==== 2024–2025: The Murphy Era begins ====
Prior to the 2024 season, baseball experts expected the Brewers to fall near the bottom of the NL Central standings, with the combined losses of manager Counsell and their ace Burnes, and the team with a young, inexperienced lineup and a new manager. However, the Brewers would go on to have another stellar season, starting 10–3, taking over first place in the NL Central in mid-April, and holding on to it through the end of the season, finishing with a 93–69 record, winning their third division championship in four years. Christian Yelich began to have a resurgent season, until lingering back issues forced him to have season-ending surgery in July. The Brewers still had major offensive contributors in William Contreras, who'd hit .281 with 23 home runs and 93 RBI's, winning his second consecutive Silver Slugger Award, and finishing 5th in National League MVP voting. Rhys Hoskins would hit 26 home runs while driving in 86 runs, while Jackson Chourio, after a rough first half of the season, would finish with a .275 batting average, with 21 home runs and 22 stolen bases, becoming the youngest player in MLB history to have a 20-20 season, at 20 years of age. Shortstop Willy Adames was the Brewers' top offensive performer, hitting 32 home runs and driving in 112 runs, as well as tying the MLB record for most three-run home runs hit in a single season with 13, a record set by Ken Griffey Jr. The Brewers would also win their second consecutive Team Gold Glove Award, as MLB's top defensive team, and would have multiple individual Gold Glove Award winners for the first time since 1980, with Sal Frelick winning the award in center field and Brice Turang winning the award at second base. Turang would also win the Platinum Glove Award, as the best fielding player in the entire MLB. Manager Pat Murphy would also win the Manager of the Year Award in the National League.

The Brewers would face the New York Mets in the Wild Card round of the MLB Playoffs, losing game 1 before tying the series in game 2 on a pair of clutch home runs by Jackson Chourio and an eventual game-winning home run by Garrett Mitchell. In game 3, the Brewers took the lead on home runs by Jake Bauers and Sal Frelick, but closer Devin Williams would give up a 3-run home run to Pete Alonso in the 9th inning, and the Brewers would lose the game 4–2, and the series. Game 3 of the Wild Card round would also be the last game ever called by legendary Brewers radio broadcaster Bob Uecker, who would pass away on January 16, 2025, at age 90, after a two-year battle with single-cell lung cancer. It also marked the fifth consecutive postseason series loss for the Brewers, going back to 2019. The Mets would go on to lose the NLCS to the Los Angeles Dodgers, which was also the first time that a team beat the Brewers in the postseason but failed to at least make the World Series, going back to 1981.

During the off-season, the Brewers would trade closer Devin Williams, who was going into the final year of his contract, to the New York Yankees in exchange for pitcher Nestor Cortes, third base prospect Caleb Durbin, and cash. They would also sign veteran starting pitcher Jose Quintana to a one-year contract. Shortstop Willy Adames would turn down a contract with the Brewers, leaving to sign with the San Francisco Giants.

Prior to the 2025 season, despite their previous year's success, the Brewers were again expected to take a step backwards, this time stemming from the losses of Devin Williams and Willy Adames. The Brewers and Milwaukee also suffered another loss when longtime beloved team radio broadcaster Bob Uecker passed away on January 16, 2025, from single-cell lung cancer, which he'd been privately fighting for 2 years.

The Brewers struggled to start the season, losing their first 5 games, including a 4-game opening series sweep at the hands of the New York Yankees, and by May 17, were stuck at a 21-25 mark. The Brewers began to turn their season around by late May, boosted by a 9-game winning streak that included sweeping a Memorial Day-weekend series against the Boston Red Sox. After inconsistency from their starting pitchers the Brewers got an unexpected boost to their rotation with an April 7 trade for former Pirates and Red Sox prospect Quinn Priester, who would establish himself as the team's second-most consistent starter behind Freddy Peralta. By the end of June, with the help of going 16-9 for the month, the Brewers came into July just 2 games behind the rival Cubs for first place in the Central division. By this time, another significant piece was added to the Brewers lineup. On June 13, the Brewers traded pitcher Aaron Civale to the Chicago White Sox, in exchange for failed prospect Andrew Vaughn. Civale and his agent had demanded the trade after the Brewers had demoted Civale from the starting rotation to the bullpen. After a short stint in Nashville, Vaughn was called up to the Brewers to replace the injured Rhys Hoskins at first base. Vaughn would hit a home run in his second at-bat as a Brewer and went on to set a franchise record by getting an RBI in each of his first 6 games as a Brewer. In addition, the Brewers got back star pitcher Brandon Woodruff to bolster their rotation and also called up highly touted prospect Jacob Misiorowski. Misiorowski would set a new MLB record with 11 perfect innings to start his MLB career and would also be named to the All-Star Game after just 7 pitching appearances, setting another record for the fewest MLB appearances prior to making his All-Star debut.

These new additions helped bolster the Brewers further, and the team had an 11-game winning streak in mid-July, which propelled the team to catch the Cubs on top of the division on July 20. The Brewers took sole possession of first place on July 28 and would hold the division lead for the rest of the season. After going 17-7 in July, the Brewers opened August with a 14-game winning streak, breaking the franchise record set in 1987, and marking only the third time in franchise history that the team had won at least 12 games in a row. The winning streak helped the team to a 21-9 record in August, and the best record in all of MLB. The Brewers would clinch a postseason spot on September 13, with a walk-off win over the St. Louis Cardinals and a loss by the New York Mets. On September 21, the Brewers clinched their 3rd straight NL Central Division championship with a loss by the Chicago Cubs and also clinched a first-round bye in the process. On September 27, the Brewers clinched the number one seed in the National League playoffs, as well as the best record in Major League Baseball, which the team had only accomplished once before, in 1982. The next day, on the final day of the regular season, the Brewers beat the Cincinnati Reds 4-2 for their 97th win of the season, breaking the franchise record of 96, set in 2011 and tied in 2018.

The Brewers would face the rival Cubs in the National League Division Series for the first-ever postseason meeting between the two rival teams. The Brewers outscored the Cubs 16-6 in the first two games, but the Cubs rallied back to tie the series by winning the next two games in Chicago. Back at home for game 5, the Brewers won the game 3-1 on home runs by William Contreras, Andrew Vaughn, and Bryce Turang, and won the series, 3 games to 2. This marked the Brewers' first postseason series win since 2018, and also their first trip to the National League Championship Series since that season as well. Just like 2018, the Brewers' postseason run ended with a defeat at the hands of the Los Angeles Dodgers, who'd swept the Brewers in 4 games before beating the Toronto Blue Jays in the World Series.

Brewers third baseman Caleb Durbin and outfielder Issac Collins would finish 3rd and 4th, respectively, in voting for National League Rookie of the Year, and Freddy Peralta, who led the National League with 17 wins, finished 5th in National League Cy Young Award voting. Pat Murphy would win his second consecutive National League Manager of the Year award, becoming the first NL manager since Bobby Cox in 2003 to win the award in consecutive seasons. General manager Matt Arnold, promoted to President of Baseball Operations during the season, also won his second consecutive MLB Executive of the Year award, becoming the first team executive to win the award in consecutive years.

==== 2026: Finally World Series Champions ====
Prior to the start of the 2026 season, the Brewers made more trades, sending their ace Freddy Peralta to the New York Mets, and also surprisingly traded Caleb Durbin and Andruw Monasterio to the Boston Red Sox for pitchers Kyle Harrison, Shane Drohan, and infielder David Hamilton. Despite being the 3-time defending NL Central Division champions, the Brewers were expected again to take a step backwards, with sportsbooks predicting the Brewers to finish with around 85 wins and finish 3rd in the NL Central, with the team unable to acquire a new power bat to help the team out, along with questions about a reliable pitching rotation minus Freddy Peralta.

The Brewers started the season without Jackson Chourio and Andrew Vaughn, who both missed most of April with hand fractures, and the team struggled early, going 13-13 to start the season, but then won 5 of their next 6 games and never fell back close to .500. In the middle of May, the Brewers swept the rival Cubs in a 3-game series at Wrigley Field and took over 1st place in the NL Central, never relinquishing it for the rest of the regular season. While noted for having a lack of power hitting, the Brewers' lineup still produced strong amounts of runs, and their starting rotation turned strong again, led by their new young dominant ace, Jacob Misiorowski, accompanied by spectacular rookie Logan Henderson, Kyle Harrison, and Robert Gasser, along with a stellar bullpen led by Trevor Megill, Abner Uribe, DL Hall, and Aaron Ashby, the latter leading all of MLB with 12 wins going into the All-Star Break, despite not having made a single start. Misiorowski also led all of MLB in strikeouts and ERA, making them the first pair of teammates to lead all of baseball in the three pitching triple crown categories (wins, strikeouts, ERA) going into the All-Star Break since the 1976 California Angels, with Nolan Ryan and Frank Tanana. The Brewers saw their division lead slip a bit in mid-August to 3 games ahead of the Cubs, before the Brewers won 3 of a 4-game series on the road against the Dodgers, then came back to Milwaukee to beat the Seattle Mariners 22-0, tying a modern MLB record for the most one-sided shutout win. The Brewers regained a strong lead over the Cubs and essentially secured their divisional lead when they swept the Cubs in a 3-game home series in early September. The Brewers cruised the rest of the season, clinching their fourth consecutive National League Central Division championship on September 15 with a win over the Pittsburgh Pirates, combined with a loss by the Cubs. They became the first team in the history of the NL Central to win the division championship four seasons in a row. On September 20, the Brewers beat the Baltimore Orioles 3-0 to win their 98th game of the season, breaking the franchise's single-season win mark they'd set the previous season. On September 24, the Brewers beat the Philadelphia Phillies 5-1 for their 100th win of the season; the first 100-win season in franchise history, and in the history of Major League Baseball in Milwaukee. The Brewers then went on to sweep the St. Louis Cardinals to finish the season with a franchise-best 103-59 record, and the best record in Major League Baseball for the second consecutive season.

The Brewers would go into the playoffs facing strong competition, first taking on the San Diego Padres in the NLDS, with the Padres having been one of the hottest teams playing throughout September. The Brewers took game 1 when William Contreras hit a home run in the 7th inning to give the Brewers the lead. In the 9th inning, Padres hitter Ty France hit a towering fly ball that looked like a potential go-ahead home run, but struck a cable on American Family Field's roof structure and was caught by Jackson Chourio for the second out. While Padres players and fans argued it would've otherwise been a home run, StatCast numbers on the fly ball's trajectory and velocity (49-degree angle at 105 MPH) indicate it would've been an out regardless. In game 2, the Brewers were behind 3-2 in the bottom of the 9th inning when they managed to load the bases against the Padres' ace closer Mason Miller. With two outs, Jackson Chourio hit a 2-run walk-off single, giving the Brewers a 4-3 win and a 2-0 series lead. After losing game 3 in San Diego 4-3, the Brewers took a 3-1 lead in game 4, when Manny Machado hit a deep fly ball to center field that looked to be a game-tying home run, but Garrett Mitchell (baseball) leaned over the low center field wall to catch the fly ball, preserving the lead and the eventual win for the Brewers, giving the Brewers the series win as well, advancing to the NLCS for the second straight year. The Game 4 win over the Padres also ended the Brewers' 13-game postseason road-game losing streak, tied with the Minnesota Twins for being the longest road-game losing streak in the postseason. The Brewers would face the Los Angeles Dodgers in the NLDS, a rematch of 2025. In game 1, the Brewers fell behind 1-0 to Dodgers ace Tarik Skubal, but Brice Turang hit a solo home run in the 4th inning, then rookie Luis Lara hit a clutch RBI single in the 5th inning to give the Brewers the lead and an eventual 2-1 win. Game 2 was a back-and-forth offensive battle, with the Brewers and Dodgers exchanging leads through the first 5 innings, until a William Contreras RBI single in the 6th gave the Brewers the lead for good, and they would score two more runs in the 8th to clinch a 7-4 win, giving the Brewers a 2-0 lead in the series. In Game 3, Dodgers starter Blake Snell kept the Brewers' bats at bay for 6 innings as the Dodgers took a 2-1 lead into the top of the 7th inning. With two outs, Jake Bauers battled with Snell for an 11-pitch at-bat that led to a 2-run home run to give the Brewers the lead, which Garrett Mitchell followed with a home run of his own, chasing Snell out of the game, and the Brewers ended up winning 7-2, putting them one win away from their first pennant and World Series appearance since 1982. In game 4, the Dodgers struck first again with a 4-0 lead in the 2nd inning, but the Brewers would chip away, with Jake Bauers hitting a 2-run double in the 4th inning; then in the 5th inning, David Hamilton hit an RBI single, and Bauers drew a bases-loaded walk to tie the game in the 5th inning. In the 6th inning, Garrett Mitchell homered for the second consecutive game, and David Hamilton followed with an unlikely home run of his own in the 9th inning to pad the Brewers' lead. Aaron Ashby would close the last 3 innings to clinch a 6-4 Brewers win and the sweep of the NLCS, clinching the Brewers' first-ever National League pennant and their second-ever trip to the World Series. The Brewers became the first team ever to get swept in a seven-game playoff series one season, then win a "revenge sweep" on the same team in a seven-game series the following season, and also became the first team ever to sweep a seven-game series and come back from behind in each of the four games they won. Jake Bauers, with several clutch at-bats and 6 RBIs in the series, won NLCS Most Valuable Player.

The Brewers would face the American League Champion Tampa Bay Rays in the 2026 World Series; the first matchup between two franchises that had never won a World Series since 1980. In Game 1, the Brewers struck in the first inning when Christian Yelich hit an RBI triple to drive in Jackson Chourio, then Yelich scored on a William Contreras single to make the score 2-0. The Brewers led 3-1 in the 9th inning when Trevor Megill had the bases loaded with one out. Megill seemed to have gotten a double-play to end the game, but a Rays review challenge found that Brewers shortstop Cooper Pratt had taken his foot off the base too soon, making it a groundball out, giving the Rays a run and one more out. Megill was able to then strike out Jonny DeLuca to end the game and give the Brewers a 1-0 Series lead. In Game 2, the Brewers fell behind early, 4-0, but were able to rally back, capped off by a home run by Sal Frelick in the 6th inning to tie the game. Cooper Pratt gave the Brewers the lead with an RBI single in the 7th inning, and Aaron Ashby had another successful multi-inning save to clinch a 5-4 Brewers win in Game 2. In Game 3, in Tampa, the Brewers were leading 2-0 in the 5th inning, and it seemed like the Rays had escaped the top of the 6th with the bases loaded, but a Brewers challenge showed that Christian Yelich beat out the force out for the potential third out, allowing the inning to continue. The Brewers then capitalized with six straight hits, scoring 8 runs in the inning, all with two outs, leading to a dominant 10-1 win and the Brewers' eighth consecutive postseason win, tying an MLB playoff record. With one win to go, the Brewers fought a hard extra-innings battle with the Rays in Game 4, when Cooper Pratt hit a home run to give the Brewers the lead in the 12th inning, and three outs away from their first-ever World Series title. However, a throwing error by third baseman Joey Ortiz led to a Rays rally to win the game 4-3. In Game 5, Jacob Misiorowski shut the Rays down for over 5 innings, while the Brewers built a 4-0 lead, helped by two RBIs from Cooper Pratt. Trevor Megill would close out the game, a 4-1 Brewers win, giving the franchise its first-ever World Series championship. William Contreras, who hit .381 with 4 RBIs, threw out 4 of 8 potential base stealers, and went an amazing 10-for-13 on ABS challenges, was named World Series MVP. Two days later, a victory parade and rally was held in Milwaukee. It was estimated that over 750,000 people attended the parade, which was larger than Milwaukee's population of 560,000.

== Other modern teams ==
In 2018, it was announced that the independent American Association would be starting a team in Milwaukee, the Milwaukee Milkmen. They began play in 2019; the club is based at Franklin Field, in the south suburb of Franklin. The team won the American Association Championship over the Sioux Falls Canaries in 2020.

== Sources ==
- Peter Filichia, Professional Baseball Franchises, Facts on File Press, 1993.
- Philip J. Lowrey, Green Cathedrals, several editions.
- Sporting News, Take Me Out to the Ballpark, 1983/1987.
- Michael Benson, Baseball Parks of North American, McFarland, 1989.
