= List of baseball parks in Milwaukee =

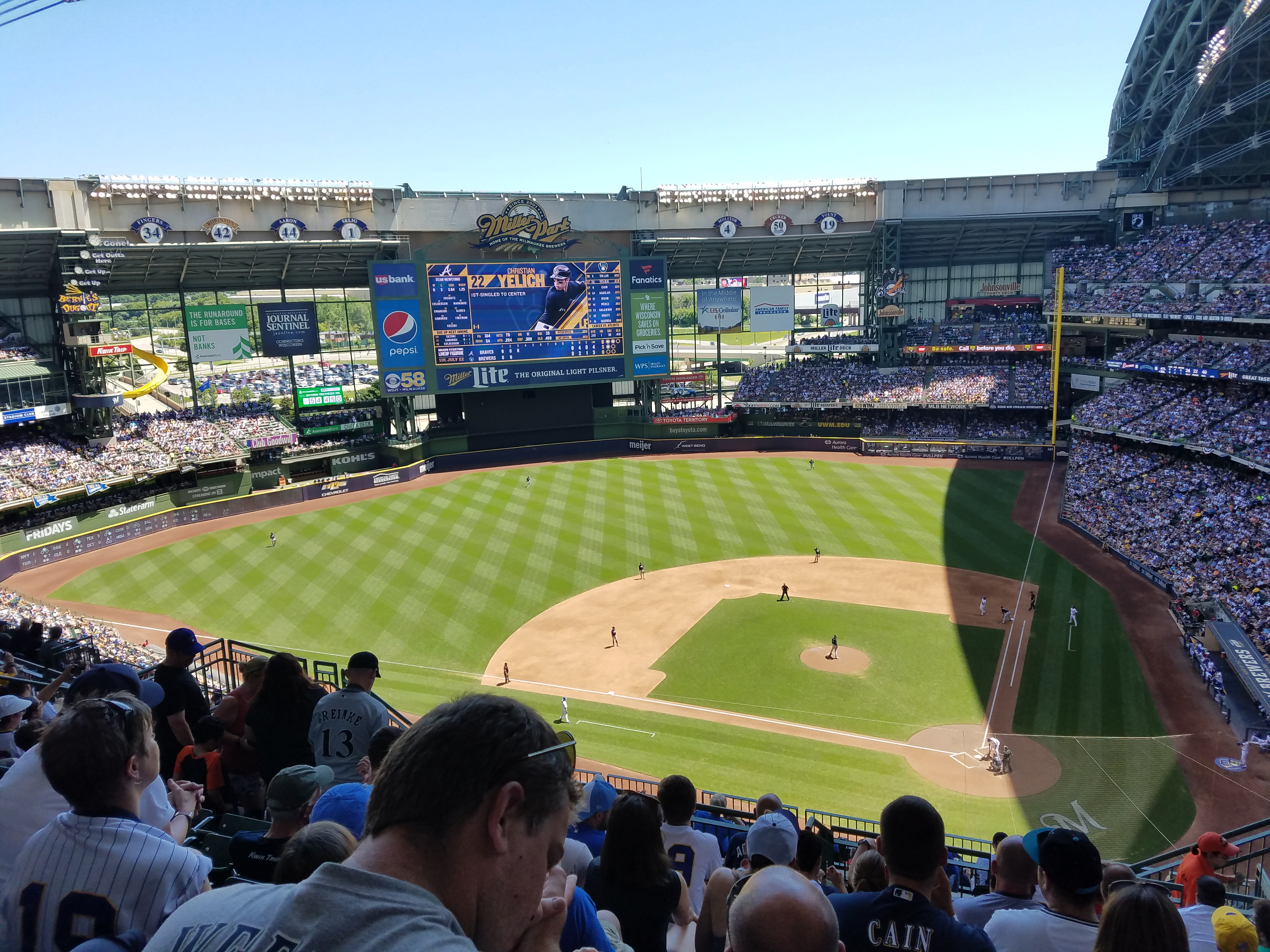
American Family Field

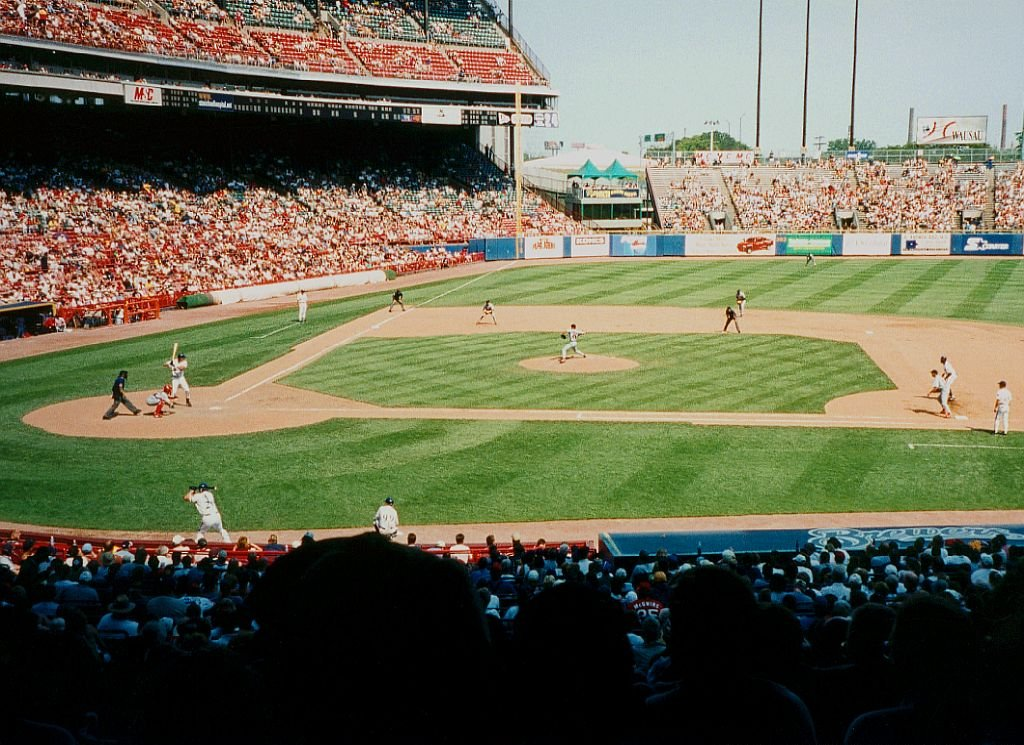
County Stadium

This is a list of venues used for professional baseball in Milwaukee, Wisconsin, presented in chronological order.

West End Grounds
Home of: Milwaukee West Ends – independent (1876) – League Alliance (1877)
Location: Wells Avenue, near city limits

Milwaukee Base-Ball Grounds
Home of: Milwaukee Brewers or Grays – National League (1878)
Location: West Clybourn Street (south); North 10th Street (east); North 11th Street (west); Clermont Street Teed into Clybourn from the south
Currently: Underneath the Marquette Interchange of the freeway system

Wright Street Grounds
Home of:

Milwaukee Brewers a.k.a. "Cream City" – Northwestern League (1884) – joined Union Association (1884 part) – Western League (1885) – Northwestern League (1886–1887)
Neutral site for Chicago White Stockings – NL – vs. Buffalo and vs. Providence, one game apiece in Sept 1885.

Location: West Clarke, North 11th, North 12th, West Wright streets
Currently: Residential homes

Athletic Park
Home of:

Milwaukee Creams or Brewers – Western League (1888–1894)
Milwaukee Brewers – American Association (1891 last half)

Location: same as Borchert Field (see below)

Lloyd Street Grounds
Home of:

Milwaukee Brewers – Western League (1895–1900) became American League (1901) (club moved to St. Louis 1902)
Milwaukee Creams – Western League (1902–1903)

Location: West Lloyd Street (south, home plate); houses and businesses, and West North Avenue (north, center field); North 16th Street (east, right field/first base); houses and North 18th Street (west, left field/third base)
Currently: Residential homes

Borchert Field (previously Athletic Park and Brewer Field)
Home of:

Milwaukee Brewers – American Association (1902–1952)
Milwaukee Bears – Negro National League (1923)
Kosciuszko Reds – Wisconsin State League (1928–1930)
Milwaukee Red Sox – Wisconsin State League (1931–1932, 1936)
Milwaukee Chicks – All-American Girls Professional Baseball League (1944)

Location: North 7th Street (first base, east); North 8th Street (third base, west); Chambers Street (home plate, south); Burleigh Street (north, center field)
Currently: I-43

Milwaukee County Stadium
Home of:

Milwaukee Braves – National League (1953–1965)
Chicago White Sox – American League (some games during 1968–1969)
Milwaukee Brewers – American League (1970–1997); moved to National League (1998–2000)

Location: 201 S. 46th St – Southwest of the intersection of Interstate 94 (I-94), U.S. Highway 41 (US 41), and Wisconsin Highway 341 (WIS 341).
Currently: Structure razed in 2001, infield remains as Little League Baseball park Helfaer Field

American Family Field (originally Miller Park)
Home of: Milwaukee Brewers – National League (2001–present)
Location: 1 Brewers way – Next to County Stadium site – Southwest of the intersection of I-94, and Brewers Boulevard (WIS 175).

== See also ==
- Lists of baseball parks
- Parks of Milwaukee

== Sources ==
- Peter Filichia, Professional Baseball Franchises, Facts on File, 1993.
- Phil Lowry, Green Cathedrals, several editions.
- Michael Benson, Ballparks of North America, McFarland, 1989.
- Brian A. Podoll, The Minor League Milwaukee Brewers, McFarland, 2003.
- Baseball Memories, by Marc Okkonen, Sterling Publishing, 1992.
