= Borchert Field =

Baseball park in Milwaukee, Wisconsin, United States

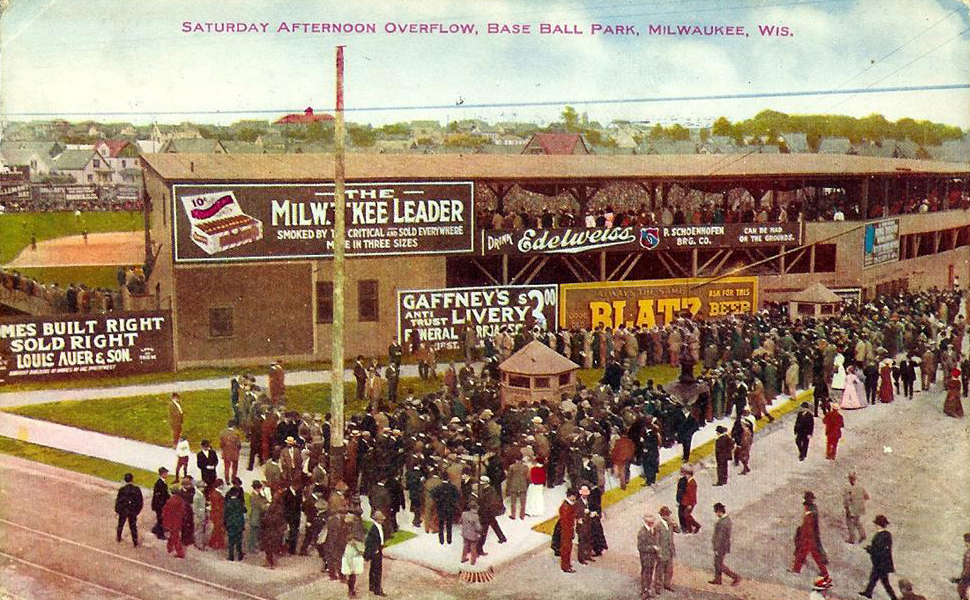
- 1911 colorized postcard of Athletic Park exterior
- Interactive map of Borchert Field
- Former names: Athletic Park (1888–1927)
- Location: Milwaukee, Wisconsin, U.S.
- Coordinates: 43.074°N 87.9205°W
- Capacity: 18,000 (1952)
- Surface: Natural grass

Construction
- Opened: 1888; 138 years ago
- Closed: 1952; 74 years ago
- Demolished: 1953

Tenants
- Baseball Milwaukee Brewers/Creams (WL) (1888–1894); Milwaukee Brewers (AA) (1891); Milwaukee Brewers (AA) (1902–1952); Milwaukee Bears (NNL) (1923); Milwaukee Chicks (AAGPL) (1944) Football Milwaukee Badgers (NFL) (1922–1926); Green Bay Packers (NFL) (1933)

Borchert Field, known at various times as Athletic Park, Brewer Field, and Borchert's Orchard, was a baseball park in Milwaukee, Wisconsin. The home field for several professional baseball clubs from 1888 through 1952, it also hosted two football teams: the Milwaukee Badgers from 1922 to 1926 and the Green Bay Packers in 1933. The stadium became obsolete after the construction of County Stadium in 1953 and was demolished later that year. After serving as a recreational area for a decade, Interstate 43 was built on top of it.

The park was built on a rectangular block in a residential area, bounded by four streets. Home plate was at the south end, with the outfield bounded by the outer fence, making fair territory home-plate-shaped, with short fields in left and right and very deep power alleys, a configuration used by a number of ballparks of the era that were constrained by a narrow block. The ballpark was redeveloped in 1910 to include a new grandstand, bleachers, outfield seats, a scoreboard, and a locker room. Lighting was also added in 1935 to allow for night games. At its peak, counting standing room tickets, the ballpark could hold about 18,000 spectators.

== History ==
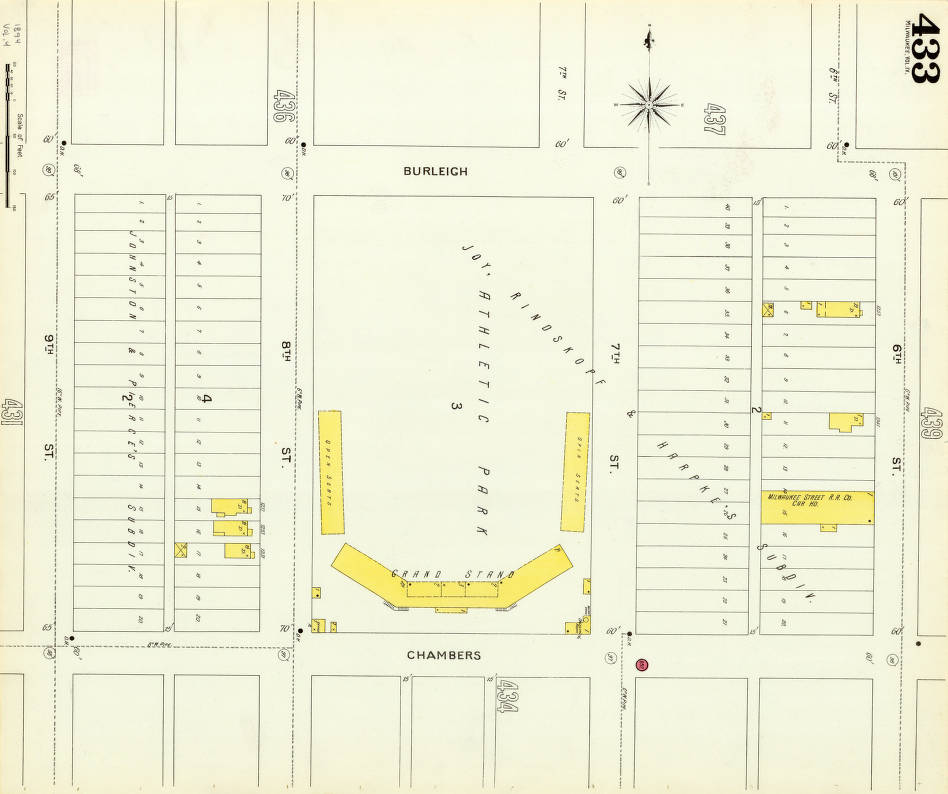
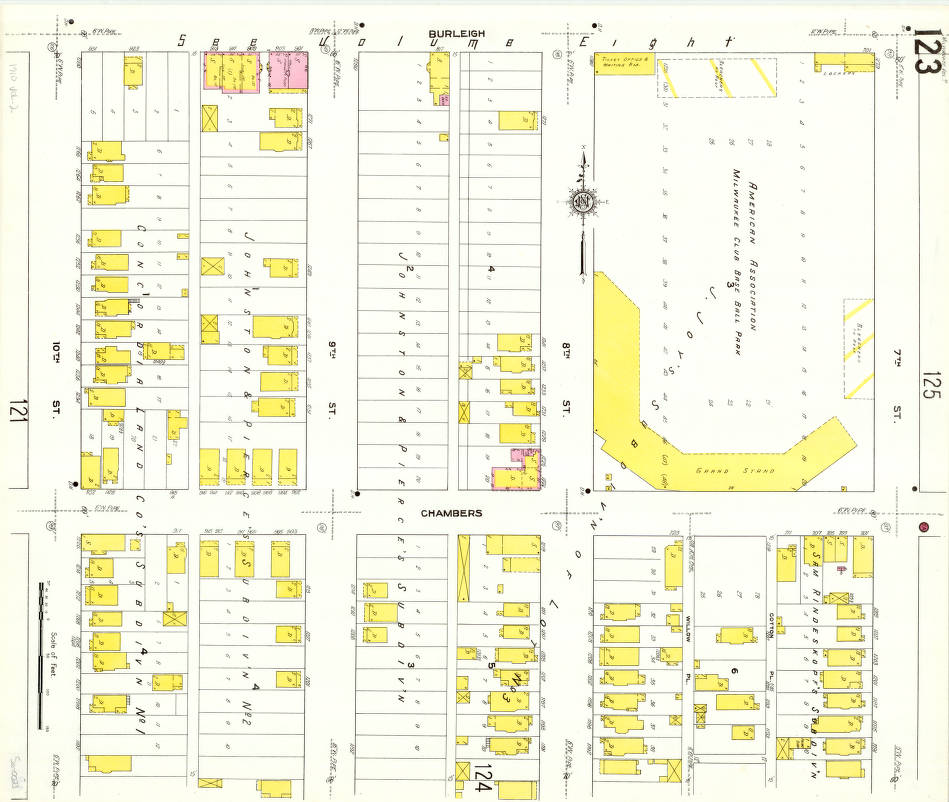
Maps from 1894 (top) and 1910 (bottom) showing the configuration of Borchert Park within the city of Milwaukee. Note the addition of stands in the outfield and the changes to the grandstand, as well as the new homes constructed in the vicinity.

=== Construction ===
Borchert Park, known when it opened as Athletic Park, was constructed in 1888 at a cost of $40,000 ($1.43 million in 2025). The property, which was purchased for about $25,000 ($1.43 million in 2025), was in a residential area of Milwaukee, Wisconsin, situated on a rectangular block bounded by four streets. The shape of the property created unique conditions in the outfield: the fences in left field and right field were located only 266 feet from home plate, while dead center was 395 feet. However, the fences in left-center and right-center were 435 feet from home plate, creating deep "power alleys". The ballpark was dedicated on May 19, 1888, with a game between clubs from Milwaukee and Saint Paul, Minnesota. It provided more space than Wright Street Grounds and even though it was farther from downtown, it had good access to public transportation. Although designed as a baseball stadium, the ballpark was also used as an ice hockey rink, as well as hosting rodeos, wrestling, and civic assemblies. The ballpark was called Athletic Park from 1888 to 1928, when it was renamed in honor of previous owner Otto Borchert, who had died the previous year. Borchert, son of Milwaukee brewing pioneer Frederick Borchert, had purchased the field in 1920. The park thereafter became known as Borchert Field. The ballpark was also called Borchert’s Orchard and Brewer Field at different times.

=== Redevelopment ===
In the early 1890s, the ballpark had a grandstand that could hold about 3,500 people, as well as bleachers and standing room that increased total capacity to about 10,000. The grandstand included box seats, although attendees complained these were cramped and too high up. With limited demand for local baseball, the property was converted to a training ground for the local National Guard. In 1902, Harry Quinn redeveloped the ballpark; this included a new 4,100-seat grandstand and two 1,500 seat bleachers; it was reopened on May 11, 1902. In 1910, the bleachers were converted to covered seating and connected to the grandstand, while new outfield bleachers, a locker room, and a scoreboard were added. Total capacity, including standing room tickets, was increased to about 18,000.

The left and right field corners were so steep and close to the field that the only observers who could see the entire field were the players themselves, and the fans in the center field bleachers. After Lou Perini bought the Brewers, he had home plate and the infield moved about 20 feet (6.1 m) toward center field. This allowed for placing bullpens in the left and right field corners, each team's pen on the opposite side of the field from their dugout so the coaching staff could watch them. It also had the effect of allowing fans to see more fair territory than they could previously. Experimental night games had been staged at Borchert from time to time, using portable lighting. The trend, especially in the minor leagues, was toward night games. Permanent lights were installed at Borchert in 1935, with the first Brewers night game being held on June 6. All of the light standards were mounted on the playing field, including a set of double poles near each corner, limiting the view of the field from some seats.

=== Later years ===
One of the more colorful times for the stadium occurred during the early 1940s when Bill Veeck owned the team. The "PT Barnum of Baseball" brought an element of whimsy and marketing to the ballpark, including fan giveaways of livestock, butter and vegetables, and staging morning games for third-shift wartime workers. According to his own autobiography, Veeck claimed to have installed a screen to make the right field target a little more difficult for left-handed pull hitters of the opposing team. The screen was on wheels, so any given day it might be in place or not, depending on the batting strength of the opposing team. Although reported on by newspapers in the 1940s, the story is likely apocryphal. Research by two members of the Society for American Baseball Research revealed no evidence of either a movable fence or any gear required for it to work.

The ballpark suffered weather damage on June 15, 1944. During a game with Columbus, a windstorm pulled off the roof on the right side of the stands, sending debris flying and damaging some houses on 7th Street. The game was immediately stopped, ending in a tie. There were some serious injuries reported, but no known fatalities. That portion of the stands remained uncovered for the remaining years of the ballpark's existence.

=== Demolition ===
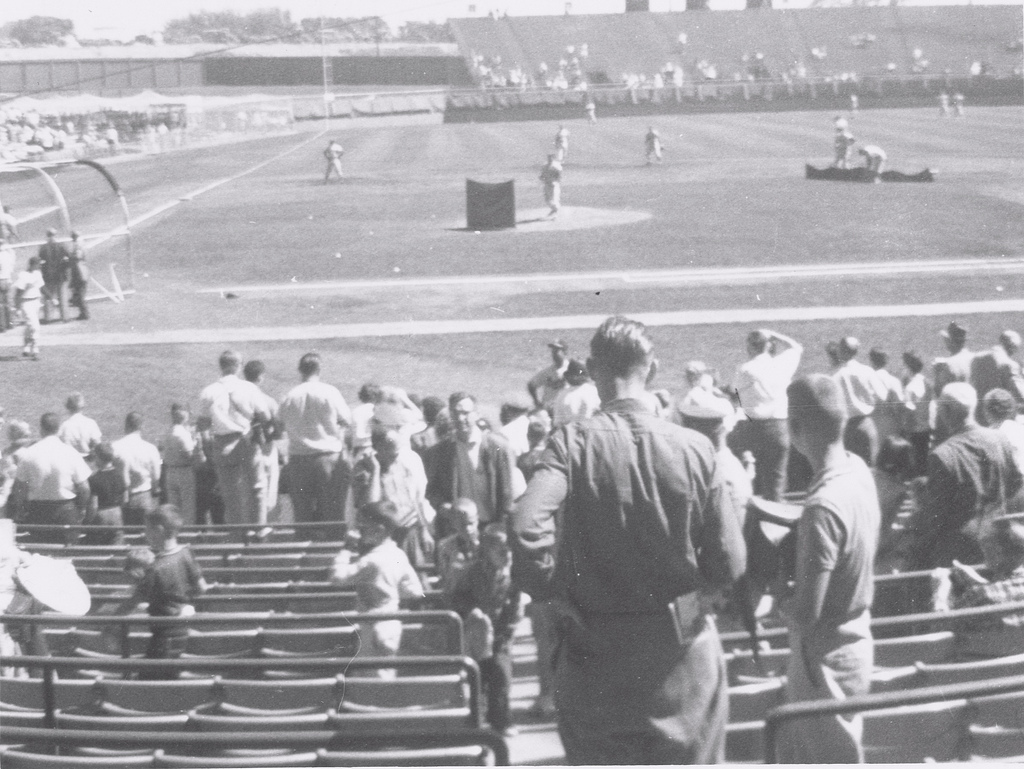
Milwaukee County Stadium, shown here in 1960, replaced Borchert Field as the city's premier baseball facility.

By the 1950s, Borchert Field was in disrepair and too small to accommodate Major League Baseball. Milwaukee civic leaders, seeking a major league franchise, built Milwaukee County Stadium to replace Borchert Field. It was intended that the minor league Brewers would move from Borchert to play in Milwaukee County Stadium in the 1953 season. However, early that year their parent club, the Boston Braves, relocated to Milwaukee and made Milwaukee County Stadium their new home. In a corresponding move, the minor league franchise moved to Toledo, Ohio, after the Toledo Mud Hens had moved the previous year. The team was renamed the Toledo Glass Sox where they won the American Association pennant that same year.

In December 1952, with Milwaukee County Stadium expected to be open for the 1953 season, Borchert Field was demolished. The demolition occurred with little public attention, with the wood from the grandstands piled up for members of the public to take for free for kindling. The city had purchased the property in 1952; during the demolition, there were proposals to use the site for a playground, homes, a school, or a highway. The field remained for some ten years as a recreational park. In 1963, the former site of the ballpark (and the entire block) became fully occupied by the new U.S. 141 North–South Freeway, now Interstate 43.

== Baseball ==
=== Milwaukee Brewers (Western League) ===
Borchert Field's first baseball tenant was the Milwaukee Brewers, a minor league baseball team in the Western League, who played there from 1886 to 1892.

=== Milwaukee Creams ===
The Milwaukee Creams, a minor league baseball team that existed in various forms from 1889 to 1913 played at Borchert Field and Lloyd Street Grounds. The Creams played at Borchert for two seasons in 1889 and 1913, and two seasons at Lloyd Street (1902 and 1903).

=== Milwaukee Brewers (American Association) ===
An independent minor league named the American Association formed in 1902, including a new Milwaukee Brewers club. The Brewers played for 51 seasons before being displaced by the major league Milwaukee Braves. The final game at the ballpark came on September 21, 1952, a Brewers loss to the Kansas City Blues in the American Association playoffs.

=== Milwaukee Bears ===
Borchert Field was also home to the Milwaukee Bears of the Negro National League in 1923. After a 12–41 record in league play during its inaugural season, the team disbanded. Although based out of Borchert, they ended up playing only nine games there, with most of their games being on the road. Borchert hosted Games 3 and 4 of the 1937 Negro American League Championship Series, which matched the Kansas City Monarchs against the Chicago American Giants (the Monarchs won both games and the Series).

=== Milwaukee Chicks ===
The Milwaukee Chicks of the All-American Girls Professional Baseball League also played their only season at Borchert Field, in 1944. The Chicks rallied during the second half of the season, going 40–19, and won the championship series against the Kenosha Comets. Borchert Field was unavailable during the series, so all seven games were played in Kenosha, Wisconsin. However, high tickets prices, poor attendance, and competition with the Milwaukee Brewers led the team to move to Grand Rapids, Michigan in 1945.

== Football ==
=== Milwaukee Badgers ===
The Milwaukee Badgers entered the National Football League (NFL) in 1922 and played at Borchert Field until 1926, when the team folded. During their five years in the NFL, the Badgers suffered from poor management, with their ownership group originally located in Chicago. Even though the Badgers had big-name players throughout their history, including Fritz Pollard, Duke Slater, Paul Robeson, Bo McMillan, Jim Conzelman, Johnny Blood, Red Dunn, and LaVern Dilweg, they were never able to translate that to success on the field; they only achieved a winning record once, going 7–2–3 in 1923. The Badgers also were punished for playing four high schoolers in a league game; they incurred a $500 ($9,179 in 2025) fine and their owners were forced to sell the team. The Badgers were readmitted to the league under new ownership before the start of the 1926 season, but after a 2–7 record the team was withdrawn from the NFL.

=== Green Bay Packers ===
Borchert Field hosted the first NFL game for the Green Bay Packers in Milwaukee. The Packers had played, and won, seven games in Milwaukee since 1921, but none of them were official league games. In September 1933, Packers leadership announced that an October 1 game against the New York Giants, originally scheduled to be played in Green Bay, Wisconsin, would be moved to Milwaukee. Lee Joannes, the president of the Packers at the time, made the announcement, noting support from the NFL for the move. Joannes stated that for many years prior, fans in the southern Wisconsin area had pushed for a game to be played in Milwaukee. Noting their strong support in the region, the Packers expected to fill Borchert Field, which had been chosen for the game, with 12,000 to 14,000 fans.

The decision was not popular in Green Bay, but the game ended up drawing the largest crowd that season for a Packers game. About 13,000 fans ended up attending the game, although the Packers lost 10–7 to the Giants. Post-game analysis from the Green Bay Press-Gazette blamed the Packers' own mistakes and the Giants' strong defensive performance for the upset loss. The game though initiated a 62-season presence for the Packers in Milwaukee. They would continue playing a few games a year there until 1994, first at Wisconsin State Fair Park (1934–1951), then Marquette Stadium (1952), and last at Milwaukee County Stadium (1953–1994).

== See also ==
- List of baseball parks in Milwaukee
- List of Green Bay Packers stadiums

Preceded by first stadium	Milwaukee Home of the Green Bay Packers; 1933	Succeeded by Wisconsin State Fair Park
Preceded by first stadium	Home of the Milwaukee Badgers; 1922 – 1926	Succeeded by last stadium
Preceded by first stadium	Home of the Milwaukee Brewers; 1894	Succeeded by Lloyd Street Grounds
