= Jim Cockman =

Canadian baseball player (1873–1947)

- Third baseman
- Born: April 26, 1873; Guelph, Ontario, Canada
- Died: September 28, 1947 (aged 74); Guelph, Ontario, Canada
- Batted: Right Threw: Right

MLB debut
- September 28, 1905, for the New York Highlanders

Last MLB appearance
- October 7, 1905, for the New York Highlanders

MLB statistics
- Batting average: .105
- Home runs: 0
- Runs batted in: 2
- Stats at Baseball Reference

Teams
- New York Highlanders (1905)

James Cockman (April 26, 1873 – September 28, 1947) was a Canadian third baseman in Major League Baseball who played for the New York Highlanders in 1905. He stood at 5' 6" and weighed 145 lbs.

== Career ==
Cockman started his professional baseball career in 1896 and batted .300 that year for the Virginia League's Roanoke Magicians. The following season, he played for the London Cockneys of the Canadian League. He batted a career-high .413 to win the batting title.

Although Cockman did "pretty good work with the stick," he was released by Toronto in 1898 and then went to the Atlantic League's Reading Coal Heavers. In 1900, Cockman played in the Eastern League, International League, and Interstate League. He posted a .307 batting average in the Interstate League, and it was the last time in his career that he would bat over .300.

From 1901 to 1903, Cockman played in the Western League with the Minneapolis Millers and Milwaukee Creams. He then spent most of the following four seasons with the Eastern League's Newark Sailors. In 1905, he hit just .232 but was acquired by the New York Highlanders (later known as the Yankees) in September. Cockman played 13 MLB games over the final month of the season. He went 4 for 38 (.105) at the plate, with 0 home runs and 2 runs batted in. At 32 years old, he was the oldest player to ever make his major league debut with the New York Yankees franchise.

Cockman went back to Newark in 1906. After short stints in Toronto and St. Paul, he played for the Western League's Lincoln Railsplitters from 1909 to 1911. In 1912, he batted .262 in the Nebraska State League and then retired after the season.

== Personal life ==
Cockman died on September 28, 1947 at a hospital in his hometown of Guelph at age 74. He was buried in Woodlawn Memorial Park, in Guelph.
