= Milwaukee Creams =

American minor league baseball team

- 1889–1913; (1889, 1902–1903, 1913); Milwaukee, Wisconsin

Minor league affiliations
- Class: Class A (1889, 1902–1903); Class C (1913)
- League: Western Association (1889); Western League (1902–1903); Wisconsin-Illinois League (1913)

Major league affiliations
- Team: None

Minor league titles
- League titles (1): 1903

Team data
- Name: Milwaukee Creams (1889, 1902–1903, 1913)
- Ballpark: Borchert Field (1889, 1913); Lloyd Street Grounds (1902–1903) (1902–1903)

The Milwaukee Creams were a minor league baseball team based in Milwaukee, Wisconsin. Between 1889 and 1913, the Creams played as members of the 1889 Western Association, Western League from 1902 to 1903 and 1913 Wisconsin-Illinois League. The Western League Creams franchise was forced to fold as the result of a territory dispute between the Western League and American Association. The Creams hosted minor league home games at Borchert Field and Lloyd Street Grounds.

Baseball Hall of Fame member Clark Griffith played for the 1889 Milwaukee Creams and Hall of Famer Hugh Duffy was player/manager of the 1902 and 1903 teams.

== History ==
The Milwaukee "Creams" began play as members of the 1889 eight-team Western Association. The Milwaukee Brewers adopted the Creams moniker for the 1889 season. Some references list other Brewers teams as both the "Brewers" and "Creams" combined in various other seasons. The 1889 team finished the season with a record of 58–63 and placed fifth, playing under manager Ezra Sutton.

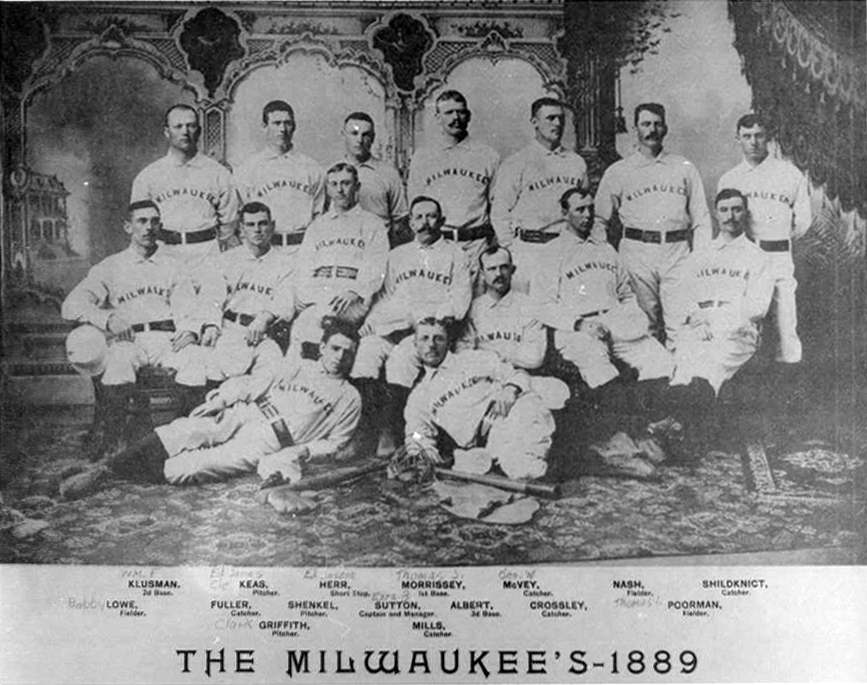
Milwaukee 1889 Team Photo. Hall of Fame member Clark Griffith is front left

Baseball Hall of Fame inductee Clark Griffith pitched for the 1889 Milwaukee Creams at age 19. Griffith had a 23–18 record for Milwaukee, throwing 328 innings.

The 1902 Milwaukee Creams team became members of the Class A level Western League. The Creams began play as the second team in Milwaukee, as the Milwaukee Brewers played as members of the American Association. Milwaukee having two Class A franchises at the same time proved to be a tenuous arrangement.

The Milwaukee Creams placed third in the 1902 Western League. Milwaukee ended the season with record of 80–54, finishing 1.0 game behind the first place Kansas City Blue Stockings. Milwaukee played under Hall of Fame member player/manager Hugh Duffy, who hit .291 in 505 at–bats at age 35. In the 1902 Western League standings, the Milwaukee Creams finished a close third place. The Kansas City Blue Stockings (82–54) finished mere percentage points ahead of the second place Omaha Indians (84–56), followed closely by the Milwaukee Creams (80–54). They were followed by the Denver Grizzlies (81–57), St. Joseph Saints (71–68), Colorado Springs Millionaires (63–75), Des Moines Midgets (54–83) and Peoria Distillers (35–103) teams in the final standings.

The 1903 Milwaukee Creams won the Western League championship and were forced to fold following the season. Milwaukee finished with a record of 83–43 under returning player/manager Hugh Duffy, who hit .300 in 75 games. The Creams finished 8.0 games ahead of the second place Colorado Springs Millionaires, with Kansas City Blue Stockings in third place, 18.0 games behind the first place Milwaukee Creams.

Following the conclusion the 1903 season, the American Association and Western League negotiated territory rights, as both were Class A level minor leagues the highest level of minor leagues in the era. As a result, the Western League franchises in Kansas City and Milwaukee were forced to fold. The Kansas City Blues remained, and the Kansas City Blue Stockings were forced to permanently fold the franchise. Milwaukee also had the exact result, as the Milwaukee Creams of the Western League were folded and the Milwaukee Brewers continued. Following the contractions, the Class A American Association and the Western League both continuing play remaining as a Class A league in 1904.

In 1913, the Milwaukee Creams briefly returned as members of the Class C level Wisconsin-Illinois League before relocating amidst controversy. The Milwaukee team was owned by Charles Moll, the previous president of the Wisconsin–Illinois League. Milwaukee was chosen as the replacement city for the folded Aurora Blues franchise in the league. This led to legal action by shunned Aurora owners.

On Wednesday, April 30, 1913, Milwaukee, nicknamed the "Mollys" by local Milwaukee newspapers, opened the Wisconsin-Illinois League season at Athletic Park, with Milwaukee Mayor Gerhard Bading throwing out the first pitch. With approximately 400 fans in attendance, Milwaukee defeated the Appleton Papermakers by the score of 12–5 in the home opener.

Beginning the season, the Creams were suffering from low attendance. Fans had two other baseball teams in the city, with the semi–pro Kosciuszko Reds and minor league Milwaukee Brewers vying for fans, leading to the Creams relocation. On June 28, 1913, the Creams had a 28–20 record when the franchise relocated to Fond du Lac, Wisconsin and finished the season as the Fond du Lac Molls. The "Molls" moniker was in reference to team owner Charles Moll, who was a Milwaukee resident and president of the American Grinder Company. At the end of the season the Milwaukee/Fond du Lac team finished in fifth place with a 63–60 overall record. Milwaukee/Fond du Lac finished 13.0 games behind the first place Oshkosh Indians, playing under managers Harry Clark, Ernest Landgraf and Marty Hogan in the two locations.

== The ballparks ==
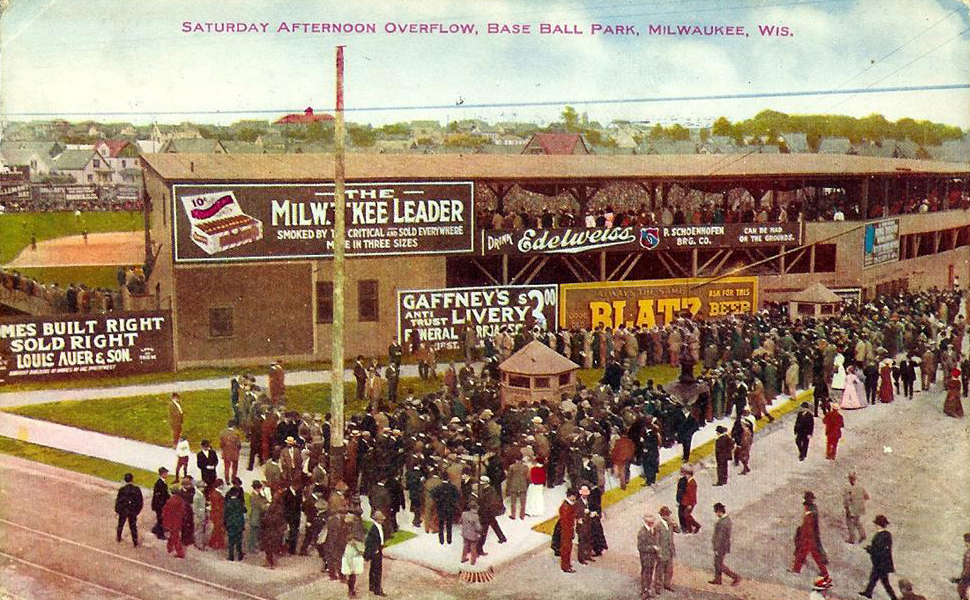
BorchertField 1911

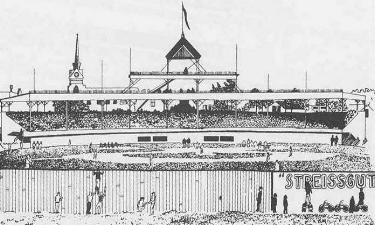
Lloyd Street Grounds

The Milwaukee Creams played 1889 and 1913 minor league home games at Borchert Field. Then known as Athletic field, the ballpark was named after owner Otto Borchert and later sold by the Borchert family in 1952 to make way for an interstate. The site is now part of I-43 between 7th Street and 8th Street in Milwaukee, Wisconsin.

In 1902 and 1903, the Milwaukee Creams hosted home games at the Lloyd Street Grounds. After the Milwaukee Creams were folded, the ballpark was demolished in 1904. The Lloyd Street Grounds were located on West Lloyd Street between North 16th Street & North 18th Street in Milwaukee, Wisconsin.

== Timeline ==
Year(s)	# Yrs.	Team	Level	League	Ballpark
1889	1	Milwaukee Creams	Class A	Western Association	Borchert Field
1902–1903	2	Milwaukee Creams	Class A	Western League	Lloyd Street Grounds
1913	1	Milwaukee Creams	Class C	Wisconsin-Illinois League	Borchert Field

== Year–by–year records ==
Year	Record	Finish	Manager	Playoffs/Notes
1889	58–63	5th	Ezra Sutton	No playoffs held
1902	80–54	3rd	Hugh Duffy	No playoffs held
1903	83–43	1st	Hugh Duffy	No playoffs held League champions
1913	28–20	NA	Harry Clark / Ernest Landgraf / Marty Hogan	Team (35–40) moved to Fond du Lac on June 28

== Notable alumni ==
- Hugh Duffy (1902-1903, MGR) Inducted Baseball Hall of Fame, 1945
- Clark Griffith (1889) Inducted Baseball Hall of Fame, 1946
- Doc Adkins (1902)
- Gus Alberts (1889)
- George Bone (1902)
- Jack Bracken (1902)
- Jim Cockman (1902–1903)
- George Davies (1889)
- Howard Earl (1889)
- Mutz Ens (1913)
- Happy Felsch (1913)
- Julie Freeman (1889)
- Frank Gatins (1902–1903)
- Bob Hall (1903)
- Bill Hassamaer (1889)
- Joseph Herr (1889)
- Jerry Hurley (1889)
- Ed Keas (1889)
- Ed Kenna (1902–1903)
- Ed Knouff (1889)
- Gus Krock (1889)
- Glenn Liebhardt (1902)
- Bobby Lowe (1889)
- John McPherson (1902–1903)
- Kohly Miller (1902–1903)
- Tom Morrissey (1889)
- Jack O'Brien (1902)
- John O'Neill (1903)
- Tom Poorman (1889)
- Jack Sheehan (1913)
- George Shoch (1889)
- Earl Smith (1913)
- George Stone (1903) 1906 AL batting champion
- Ezra Sutton (1889, MGR)
- Len Swormstedt (1902–1903)
- John Thornton (1902–1903)
- Farmer Vaughn (1902)
- Paul Wachtel (1913)
- Joe Wall (1902)

== See also ==
- Milwaukee Creams players
- History of professional baseball in Milwaukee
