= Lloyd Street Grounds =

Baseball park in Wisconsin, US

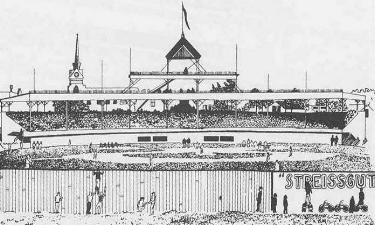
- Interactive map of Lloyd Street Grounds
- Location: N 18th St. & W Lloyd St. up to W North Ave; Milwaukee, Wisconsin
- Coordinates: 43°3′32″N 87°56′2″W
- Capacity: 10,000
- Surface: Grass
- Field size: Unknown

Construction
- Opened: 1895
- Closed: 1903

Tenants
- Milwaukee Brewers (WL/AL) (1895–1901); Milwaukee Creams (WL) (1902–1903)

Lloyd Street Grounds was a baseball park located in Milwaukee, Wisconsin. It was used by two different professional baseball clubs during 1895–1903.

The field was situated about 1 mile (1.6 km) northwest of downtown Milwaukee in the eastern part of a block bounded by West North Avenue on the north, North 16th Street on the east, North 18th Street on the west and West Lloyd Street on the south. The field faced due north, so Lloyd Street ran directly behind home plate and the grandstand.

== History ==
=== Milwaukee Brewers ===
The first occupants of the Lloyd Street Grounds were the Milwaukee Brewers of the Western League, which opened the park in 1895 after leaving Athletic Park, the eventual Borchert Field.

When the National League contracted by four teams following the 1899 season, it opened the door for a second major league. Ban Johnson, president of the Western League, changed his league's name to the American League for the 1900 season, although it remained officially a minor league. He placed teams in cities that the National League had shunned, and other teams were placed in already existing National League cities to create a rivalry.

In 1901, the American League became a major league, retaining Milwaukee as one of its charter members. Almost from the start of the season plans were underway to relocate the Brewers; this contributed to the club finishing last with a 48–89 record. The first major-league game played at Lloyd Street was on 3 May 1901 and the last on 12 September 1901.

In 1902, the Brewers announced they were moving to become the St. Louis Browns, where they played until 1954, when the Browns relocated to become the Baltimore Orioles. Milwaukee was a successful minor-league city for years, before getting another major-league team in 1953, when the National League's Boston Braves relocated and became the Milwaukee Braves. After the Braves left in 1966, the Milwaukee Brewers were re-incarnated in 1970, when the Seattle Pilots arrived after operating for just a single season.

=== Milwaukee Creams ===
A new Western League formed in 1902, with the Milwaukee Creams as a charter member. This club played for two years in competition with the new Milwaukee Brewers of the newly formed American Association, which had re-opened the park eventually known as Borchert Field.

The city wasn't large enough to support two clubs, and the Western League entry folded after 1903. The Western League itself continued on until 1937, maintaining a close relationship with the American Association, trading franchises back and forth on occasion, and playing post-season series from time to time. But 1903 was the end of the Western League's Milwaukee experiment, and of the Lloyd Street ballpark as a professional venue.

=== Demolition ===
The Lloyd Street ballpark was torn down in 1904. By 1909, North 17th Street was extended through the ballpark site and the property became populated with new homes. Today, the site is a residential neighborhood.

== See also ==
- List of baseball parks in Milwaukee

== Sources ==
- Michael Benson, Baseball Parks of North America, McFarland, 1989.

Preceded by first ballpark	Home of the Milwaukee Brewers; 1901	Succeeded by Sportsman's Park
