= Wright Street Grounds =

Former baseball ground in Milwaukee, Wisconsin

- Interactive map of Wright Street Grounds
- Location: Milwaukee, Wisconsin
- Coordinates: 43°03′53″N 87°55′34″W
- Operator: Milwaukee Brewers
- Capacity: 5,300
- Surface: Grass

Construction
- Built: 1884
- Closed: 1895

Tenant
- Milwaukee Brewers

Wright Street Grounds is a former baseball ground located in Milwaukee, Wisconsin. The ground was home to the Milwaukee Brewers of the Union Association in 1884, and minor league versions of the same team during early 1884 and 1885 through 1888.

The ballpark was located on the block bounded by West Wright Street, West Clarke Street, North Eleventh Street, and North Twelfth Street.

== 1884 -1885 Season ==
The Brewers played most of the 1884 season as members of the Northwestern League. They came into the Union as a late-season replacement. Their first home game was September 27, and their last was October 12. The club returned to the NWL in 1885.

1885 also saw some major league ball, as the Chicago White Stockings of the National League, who would win the league championship that year, staged a couple of games in Milwaukee: September 4, vs. the Buffalo Bisons; and September 25, vs. the Providence Grays. Those two teams were both in their final years in the National League.

== See also ==
- List of baseball parks in Milwaukee

== Sources ==
- Michael Benson, Baseball Parks of North America, McFarland, 1989.
