= Horlick =

Horlick or Horlicks may refer to:

== People ==
- Horlick Baronets, of Cowley Manor in the County of Gloucester, a title in the Baronetage of the United Kingdom
- Harry Horlick (1896–1970), American violinist and orchestra leader
- James Horlick (disambiguation)
- John Horlick (disambiguation)
- Leah Horlick (fl. from 2013), Canadian poet
- Nicola Horlick, (born 1960), British investment fund manager
- Ted Horlick (1925–2021), British naval officer
- William Horlick (1846–1936), English-born food manufacturer and the original patent holder of malted milk

== Other uses ==
- Horlicks, a malted drink from GlaxoSmithKline
- Horlicks (horse) (1983–2011), an outstanding Thoroughbred racemare from New Zealand
- Horlick Mountains, a mountain range in the Transantarctic Mountains of Antarctica, lying eastward of Reedy Glacier

== See also ==
- John Van Horlick (born 1949), a former World Hockey Association player for the Toronto Toros
