= Racine Malted Milks =

- 1909–1914; (1909–1915); Racine, Wisconsin

Minor league affiliations
- Class: Class D (1909); Class C (1910–1914); Class D (1915)
- League: Wisconsin-Illinois League (1909–1914); Bi-State League (1915)

Major league affiliations
- Team: None

Minor league titles
- League titles (0): None

Team data
- Name: Racine Malted Milks (1909–1911, 1914); Racine Belles (1912–1913, 1915)
- Ballpark: Horlick Field (1909–1915)

The Racine Malted Milks were a minor league baseball team based in Racine, Wisconsin.

Racine teams played from 1909 to 1914 as members of the Class C level Wisconsin-Illinois League, alternating between being known by the "Malted Milks" and "Belles". The Racine Belles played the 1915 season as members of the Bi-State League after the Wisconsin-Illinois League permanently folded following the 1914 season.

The Racine teams hosted minor league home games at Horlick Field. William Horlick was the inventor of malted milk and was an owner of the Horlick Malted Milk Company of Racine.

== History ==
=== 1909 to 1914 Wisconsin-Illinois League ===
In 1866, a two Racine teams consisting of members of the Racine Baseball Club, played the first known organized baseball game in Racine. In the 1880, the Third Ward Baseball Team was organized in Racine, with Racine residents Charlie Ganzel and John Ganzel as a members of the team. There were organized leagues in Racine populated by factory teams beginning in the 1890s.

In 1908, the Wisconsin State League changed names to become the Wisconsin-Illinois League, remaining a Class D level minor league. The name change occurred after the Rockford Reds joined the Freeport Pretzels, giving the league two Illinois based teams as members. Following the 1908 Wisconsin-Illinois League season, the defending Wisconsin-Illinois League champion Wausau Lumberjacks team switched leagues and became charter members of the Minnesota-Wisconsin League. On January 9, 1909, it was reported that the Racine semi-professional team would not be returning to the Lake Shore League. The departed Wausau franchise was replaced by the new Racine team in the 1909 Wisconsin-Illinois League.

The newly formed Racine team joined the Appleton Papermakers, Fond du Lac Giants, Freeport Pretzels, Green Bay Bays, Madison Senators, Oshkosh Indians and Rockford Reds teams in beginning Wisconsin-Illinois League play on May 5, 1909.

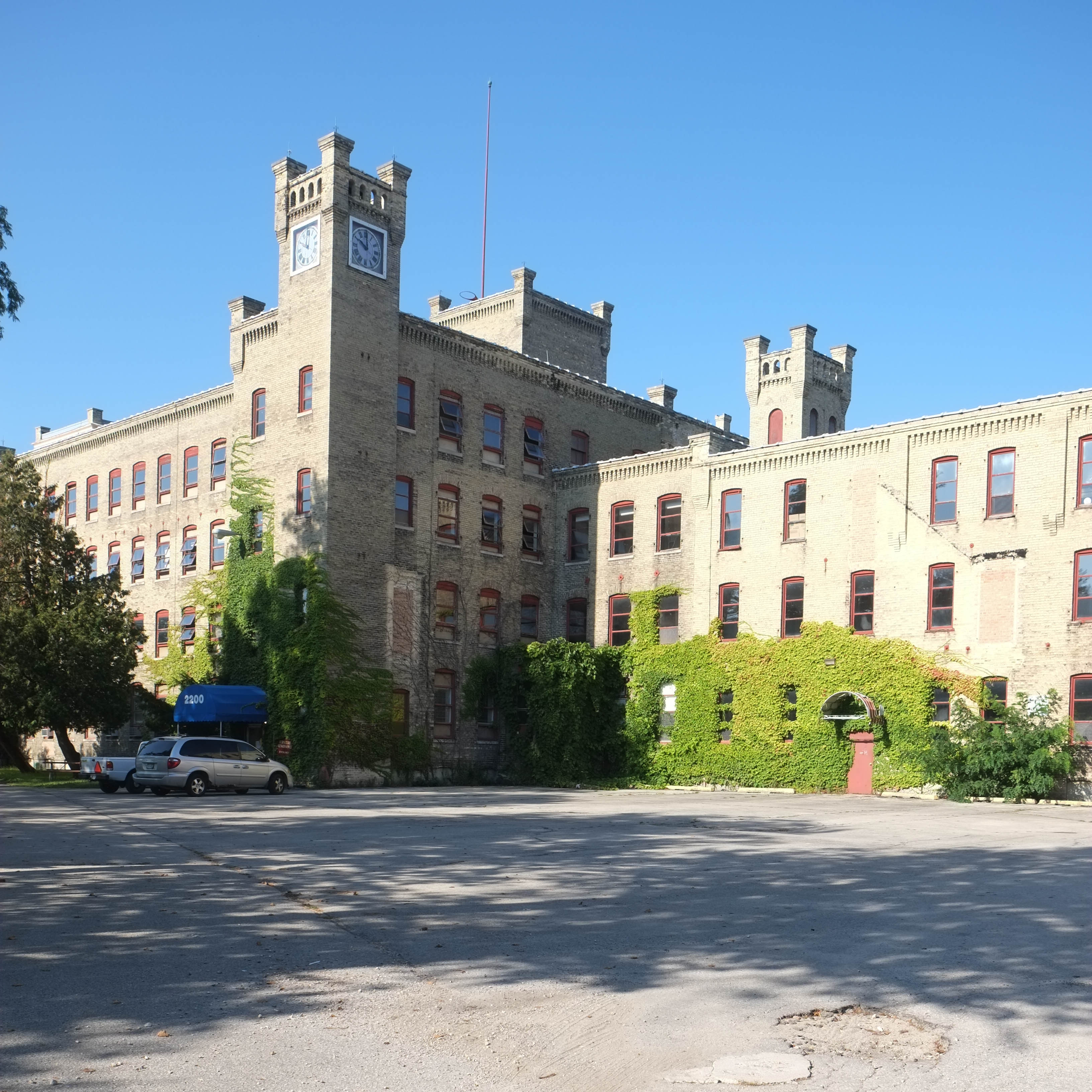
(2018) Horlick Malted Milk Company. National Register of Historic Places. Racine, Wisconsin.

Racine teams hosted minor league home games at Horlick Field. William Horlick was the inventor of malted milk and he and his brother James were the owners of the Horlick Malted Milk Company founded in Racine in 1873. The team being known as the "Malted Milks" corresponds with their home ballpark and the Horlick facility being based in Racine.

The Racine Malted Milks began minor league play in 1909 as the team finished in fourth place in the eight-team Class D level Wisconsin-Illinois League final standings. The Malted Milks ended the 1909 season with a record of 66–58, playing the season under returning manager William Armstrong. Racine ended the season 11.0 games behind the first place Madison Senators in the eight-team league final standings.

==== 1910 Racine fans incident ====
On Saturday, May 7, 1910, an incident occurred at the League Park, following the game between Racine and Oshkosh won by Oshkosh 6-0. After a series of controversial calls during the game, Racine fans attacked umpire Jerry Eddinger after the game, pelting the umpire with thrown stones, bottles and other objects. In the fracas, the young son of player William M. Lewis suffered a fractured skull. Racine manager William Armstrong was hit by rocks while attempting to protect Eddinger. Racine Policeman John Harms intervened. The Racine Journal reported that after some disputed calls, "the bleacher crowd became infuriated and made a break toward the umpire, yelling to 'kill him,' 'robber,' 'rotten,' and other things that would not look well in print." Immediately after the last out of the game was made, the Racine fans who were involved rushed onto the playing field, reportedly throwing stones, sticks, pieces of dirt and soda bottles at the umpire. Eddinger was not severely injured and retreated into the peanut stand. There, Eddinger changed his clothing before he was escorted out of the ballpark into a waiting automobile.

The 1910 Wisconsin-Illinois League was upgraded to become a Class C level league from a Class D level league. In 1910, there were 29 leagues classified as Class D level minor leagues, expanded from 13 Class D level leagues in 1909. Continuing play in the 1910 eight-team Wisconsin-Illinois League, the Racine Malted Milks ended the season in sixth place, as the team was led by returning manager William Armstrong. The Malted Milks finished with a record of 59–62, ending the season 16.0 games behind the first place Appleton Papermakers in the eight-team league.

In 1911, Racine Malted Milks again placed sixth in the eight-team Wisconsin-Illinois League. Racine ended the season with a record of 58–64 in playing under manager Larry Hoffman. The champion Rockford Wolverines team ended the season with a final record of 74–46 and finished 17.0 games ahead of Racine.

With Bill Fox becoming the manager, the team became known as the Racine "Belles" and improved to finish in second place in the 1912 Wisconsin-Illinois League standings. The Malted Milks ended the season with a record of 78–51, as Oshkosh won their first of three consecutive league championships in finishing 7.5 games ahead of runner up Racine in the Class C level eight-team league. Racine pitcher Al Kench led the league with a 21–7 record.

The Racine "Belles" continued as members of the 1913 Class C level Wisconsin-Illinois League. In the eight-team league, the Belles again finished as the runner up to Oshkosh as the team compiled a final record of 72–51, with Bill Fox returning as manager. The Malted Milks ended the season 4.0 games behind the Oshkosh Indians in the eight-team league final standings, as Oshkosh won their second consecutive championship.

In 1914, the Racine "Malted Milks" played a final season as members of the eight–team Class C level Wisconsin-Illinois League. Racine joined the Appleton Papermakers, Green Bay Bays Madison Senators, Marinette-Menominee Twins, Oshkosh Indians, Rockford Wolves and Wausau Lumberjacks teams in playing the final season of the league.

Racine finished the 1914 Wisconsin-Illinois League season in fourth place, with an overall record of 64–58, under returning manager Frank Reynolds. First place Oshkosh finished 13.0 games ahead of Racine in the final Wisconsin-Illinois League standings. Pitcher Clayton Clark of Racine led the Wisconsin-Illinois League with a 21–7 record.

=== 1915 Bi-State League ===
The Wisconsin-Illinois League did not return to play in 1915 and Racine continued play in a new league. Racine again became the Racine Belles and continued play in 1915 charter members of the six-team Class D level Bi-State League. The league folded during the season.

The Bi-State League was formed for the 1915 season with the Aurora Foxes, Elgin Watch Makers, Freeport Pretzels, Ottawa Indians and Streator Boosters teams joined with Racine as charter members in beginning play on May 11, 1915. The Bi-State League disbanded on July 7, 1915, after the Aurora and Elgin teams folded simultaneously.

The Belles were managed by the returning Frank Reynolds and James Sheffield. Racine finished in second place when the Bi-State League folded. With a 29–19 record, Racine was 1.0 game behind the first place Streator Boosters (30–18) in the final standings. They were followed by Elgin Watch Makers (27–26), Aurora Foxes (25–27), Freeport Pretzels (23–29) and Ottawa Indians (20–35) teams in the final standings. Racine led the Bi-State League in several categories. Albert "Bull" Durham led the league in hitting, with a batting average of .356. James Sheffield scored 40 runs and Clay Schoonover had 67 total hits and 5 home runs to lead the league.

After the folding of the Bi-State League, Racine next hosted a minor league team when Racine played the 1926 season, placing fifth in the Wisconsin-Illinois Association. In 1946, Racine became home of the Racine Belles, who began a tenure of play in the All-American Girls Professional Baseball League.

== The ballpark ==
Racine hosted minor league home games at Horlick Field. The land for the field was donated by William Horlick and was designed by Walter Dick. The ballpark site opened and first hosted sports beginning in 1906, first being called "League Park."

On October 1, 1922, after their name change from the Decatur Staleys, the Chicago Bears played their first National Football League under that nickname in a game at Horlick Field, a 6-0 win over the Racine Legion team.

The Racine Belles, known through the film A League of Their Own, hosted home All-American Girls Professional Baseball League home games at the ballpark.

In 1945, the Chicago American Giants team of the Negro American League hosted several games at the Horlick Field.

Still in use today, Horlick Field is located at 1648 North Memorial Drive in Racine, Wisconsin.

== Timeline ==
Year(s)	# Yrs.	Team	Level	League	Ballpark
1909–1911	3	Racine Malted Milks	Class D	Wisconsin-Illinois League	Horlick Field
1912–1913	2	Racine Belles	Class D	Wisconsin-Illinois League	Horlick Field
1914	1	Racine Malted Milks	Class C	Wisconsin-Illinois League	Horlick Field
1915	1	Racine Belles	Class D	Bi-State League	Horlick Field

== Year-by-year records ==
Year	Record	Finish	Manager	Playoffs/notes
1909	66–58	4th	William Armstrong	No playoffs held
1910	59–62	6th	William Armstrong	No playoffs held
1911	58–64	6th	Larry Hoffman	No playoffs held
1912	78–51	2nd	Bill Fox	No playoffs held
1913	72–51	2nd	Bill Fox	No playoffs held
1914	64–58	4th	Frank Reynolds	No playoffs held
1915	29–19	2nd	Frank Reynolds / James Sheffield	League folded July 7

== Notable alumni ==
- Bert Brenner (1912)
- Art Bues (1909-1910)
- Bill Fox (1912-1913, MGR)
- Frank Genins (1909)
- Herb Hall (1914)
- Larry Hoffman (1911, MGR)
- Ellis Johnson (1912-1913)
- Frank Kitson (1909)
- Art Kores (1910)
- Braggo Roth (1911)
- Ray Shook (1914-1915)
- Racine Belles players
- Racine Malted Milks players
