= Racine Belles (1909–1915) =

Racine Belles / Racine Malted Milks
- 1909–1915; [[Racine, Wisconsin]]

Minor league affiliations
- Previous classes: Class D (1909, 1915); Class C (1910–1914)
- Previous leagues: Bi-State League (1915); Wisconsin-Illinois League (1909–1914)

Team data
- Previous names: Racine Malted Milks (1909–1911, 1914); Racine Belles (1912–1913, 1915)
- Previous parks: Horlick Field (1909–1915)

The Racine Belles and Racine Malted Milks were a minor league baseball team based in Racine, Wisconsin that operated from 1909 to 1915. The team played six seasons in the Wisconsin-Illinois League (1909–1914) and a final, shortened season in the Bi-State League (1915). Throughout their existence, the team alternated between two nicknames: the Malted Milks in 1909–1911 and 1914, and the Belles in 1912–1913 and 1915.

== History ==
The team entered the Wisconsin-Illinois League in 1909 as a Class D club, operating as the Racine Malted Milks. The league reclassified to Class C the following season, and Racine competed at that level through the end of the 1914 campaign.

The Malted Milks nickname came directly from the city's most prominent industry. William Horlick, inventor of malted milk and founder of the Horlick Malted Milk Company in Racine, donated the land on which the team's home ground was built. The park, designed in 1907 by architect Walter Dick, became known as Horlick Field and served as the team's home throughout their entire existence.

The Wisconsin-Illinois League disbanded permanently after the 1914 season. For 1915, Racine entered the newly formed Bi-State League, a Class D successor circuit with six member clubs: the Aurora Foxes, Elgin Watch Makers, Freeport Pretzels, Ottawa Indians, Racine Belles, and Streator Boosters. The league opened play on May 11, 1915 but folded on July 7 after the Aurora and Elgin franchises collapsed. At the time of the league's disbandment, Racine held second place behind the Streator Boosters.

== Season-by-season results ==
Season	Name	League	Class	Notes
1909	Racine Malted Milks	Wisconsin-Illinois League	D	
1910	Racine Malted Milks	Wisconsin-Illinois League	C	
1911	Racine Malted Milks	Wisconsin-Illinois League	C	
1912	Racine Belles	Wisconsin-Illinois League	C	
1913	Racine Belles	Wisconsin-Illinois League	C	
1914	Racine Malted Milks	Wisconsin-Illinois League	C	
1915	Racine Belles	Bi-State League	D	2nd place when league folded July 7

== Home park ==
The team played all home games at Horlick Field, on the north side of Racine. The land was donated by William Horlick, whose malted milk company was the city's best-known business. The field later served as home to the Racine Belles of the All-American Girls Professional Baseball League (1943–1950) and to two National Football League teams, the Racine Legion (1922–1924) and the Racine Tornadoes (1926).
