= Sir James Horlick, 4th Baronet =

British soldier, businessman & politician (1886-1972)

Lieutenant colonel Sir James Nockells Horlick OBE, MC
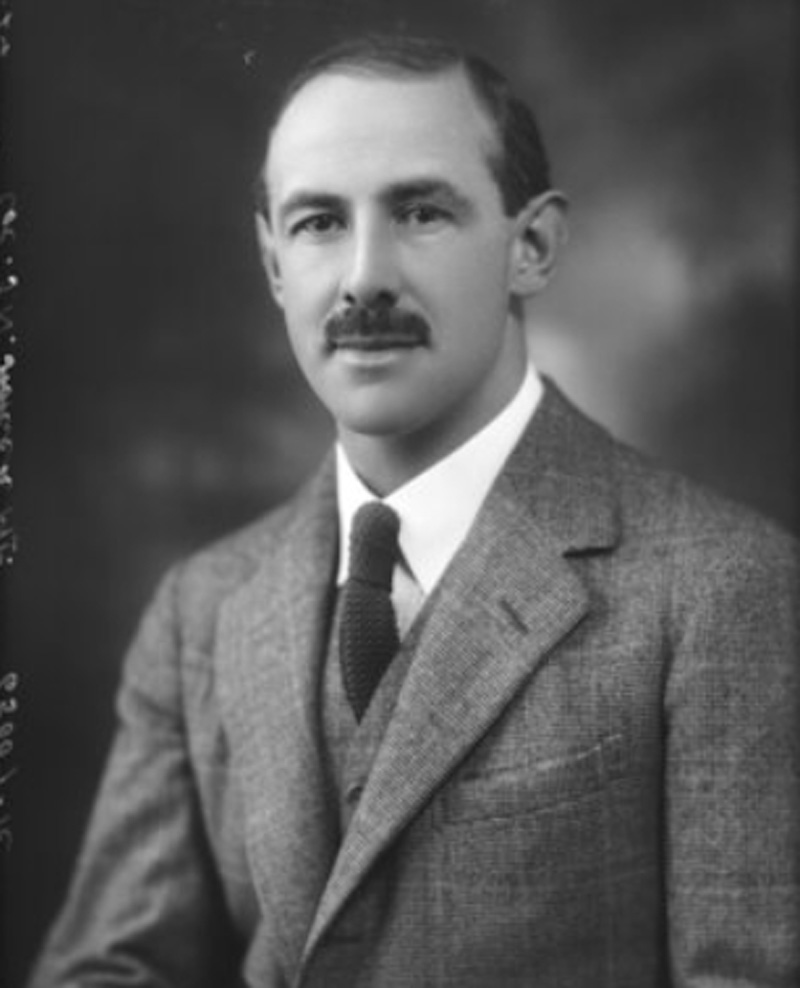
- James Horlick (c. 1920)

MP for Gloucester
- In office 1923–1929
- Preceded by: Sir James Bruton
- Succeeded by: Leslie Boyce

Personal details
- Born: 22 March 1886 Brooklyn, New York City, US
- Died: 31 December 1972 (aged 86) Gigha, Argyll and Bute, Scotland
- Party: Conservative
- Spouse(s): Flora McDonald Martin (m. 1909) Joan Isabel MacGill (m. 1956)
- Children: 3
- Parents: Sir James Horlick (father); Margaret Adelaide Burford (mother)
- Relatives: William Horlick (brother)
- Education: Eton College; Christ Church, Oxford
- Known for: Horlicks Malted Milk
- Military career
- Allegiance: United Kingdom
- Branch: British Army
- Service years: 1914–1918
- Rank: Lieutenant colonel
- Unit: Coldstream Guards
- Conflicts: World War I; Salonika front
- Awards: Military Cross; Greek Military Cross, Order of the White Eagle with Swords (4th class), Chevalier Legion d'Honneur

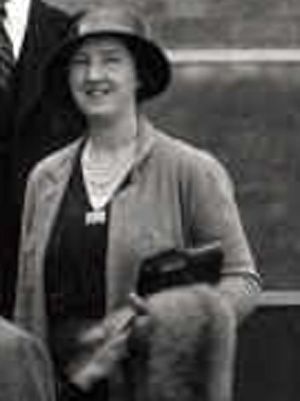
his first wife (ca. 1931)

Lieutenant-Colonel Sir James Nockells Horlick, 4th Baronet, OBE, MC (1886–1972) was the second son of Sir James Horlick, first holder of the Horlick Baronetcy, of Cowley Manor in the County of Gloucester, England, and Margaret Adelaide Burford. James, the 1st Baronet, was co-inventor (with his brother William) of Horlicks Malted Milk.

A recipient of the MC from both the UK and Greece for his actions during World War I, he briefly served as MP for Gloucester, was chairman of Horlicks Ltd and in later life became a renowned breeder of rhododendrons at his island home at Gigha in the west of Scotland.

== Biography ==
Born in Brooklyn, New York on 22 March 1886, James was educated at Eton College and Christ Church, Oxford. While at Oxford Horlick played one first-class cricket match for Oxford University Cricket Club against Yorkshire in 1906, before playing two first-class matches for Gloucestershire, making one appearance each in the 1907 County Championship and the 1910 County Championship. He joined the Coldstream Guards at the outbreak of war in 1914, serving in Salonika. It was here that he met King Alexander of Greece and his wife Aspasia Manos, to whom he was later to donate the Garden of Eden in Venice and with whom he remained good friends. Mentioned in dispatches four times, James was also a recipient of the Military Cross, Greek Military Cross, Order of the White Eagle with Swords (4th class), and the Chevalier Legion d'Honneur and was returned as Conservative member of parliament for Gloucester in the 1923 General Election, which he served until 1929.

In 1944 he purchased Achamore House and the island of Gigha where he set about planting a rhododendron garden that still exists. His work as a rhododendron breeder earned him, in 1963, the Victoria Medal of Honour. He used his experience of the family business to support the island's dairy industry.

Inheriting the Horlick baronetcy from his nephew in 1958, he died at his home in Gigha on 31 December 1972.

== Family ==
Sir James married twice. His first marriage was in 1909 to Flora McDonald Martin, CB, daughter of Col Cunliffe Martin and granddaughter of Sir James Ranald Martin. Their children were:

- Rachel Katherine Horlick
- Ursula Priscilla Marie Gabrielle Horlick
- Sir John James McDonald Horlick, 5th Bt.

He married secondly, in 1956, Joan Isabel MacGill.

Parliament of the United Kingdom
| Preceded by Sir James Bruton | Member of Parliament for Gloucester; 1923–1929 | Succeeded by Leslie Boyce |
Baronetage of the United Kingdom
| Preceded by Peter James Cunliffe Horlick | Baronet (of Cowley Manor); 1958–1972 | Succeeded by John James Macdonald Horlick |
