= James Horlick =

James Horlick may refer to:

- Sir James Horlick, 1st Baronet (1844–1921) of the Horlick Baronets
- Sir James Horlick, 4th Baronet (1886–1972), MP for Gloucester
- Sir James Cunliffe William Horlick, 6th Baronet (born 1956) of the Horlick baronets
