= Holík =

Holík (feminine Holíková) is a Czech surname. Notable people with the surname include:

- Andrea Holíková (born 1968), Czech tennis player
- Bobby Holík (born 1971), retired Czech-American professional ice hockey center
- Jaroslav Holík (1942–2015), retired professional ice hockey player
- Jiří Holík (born 1944), retired professional ice hockey player
- Libor Holík (born 1998), Czech footballer
- Lukáš Holík (born 1992), Czech footballer
- Norbert Holík (born 1972), Paralympian athlete from Slovakia
- Petr Holík (born 1992), Czech ice hockey player
- Vladimír Holík (born 1978), Czech ice hockey player
- Vyachaslaw Holik (born 1989), Belarusian professional footballer

== See also ==
- Holika
- Holiki
- Hollick
- Horlick (disambiguation)
