= List of arts and culture resources in Racine, Wisconsin =

This page is a compilation of arts and culture resources available in Racine, Wisconsin, United States.

== Art museums ==
- Racine Art Museum is dedicated to the exhibition, education, collection and preservation of contemporary visual arts, with a focus on artists who create meaningful statements in craft media.
- RAM's Wustum Museum of Fine Arts displays works in fine art and craft media that are organized around specific themes. RAM also offers arts education through Wustum Museum, where it has community outreach programs, studio art classes and workshops taught by regionally and nationally known artists working in craft media.
- SC Johnson Gallery: At Home with Frank Lloyd Wright displays a rotating selection of Frank Lloyd Wright's designs and artifacts, and explores the architect's influence on families and the American home.

== Cultural institutions ==
- Racine Public Library
- Racine Heritage Museum
- Preservation Racine is a nonprofit organization established in 1973 to identify and actively encourage the preservation of buildings, sites, and districts in the Racine, Wisconsin area which have historical, architectural, and cultural value. The organization holds an annual tour of historic buildings to raise awareness and money for its mission.
- Racine Zoological Gardens: The zoo has approximately 100 different species of animals from Wisconsin and around the world.

== Theater companies ==
- Racine Theatre Guild: RTG is a community theater that provides a variety of live entertainment and educational opportunities for all ages. RTG annually offers a season of eight main-stage plays and musicals, Racine Children's Theatre, Jean's Jazz Series and Comedy Tonight
- Over Our Head Players/6th Street Theatre:

== Performance groups (poetry and music) ==
- BONK! Performance Series: A monthly event that aims to bring poetry, art, and performance to the local arts community.
- Family Power Music/Grassroots Wednesdays Open Mic and Artist Showcase: Grassroots Wednesdays is an open mic and artist showcase.

== Visual arts organizations ==
- Art For Uptown is a grassroots initiative to revitalize Uptown Racine through the arts.
- Racine Arts Council encourages, supports and advocates on behalf of emerging and established artists, artistic groups in our community and young people interested in the arts.
- Black Arts Council of Racine is an organization that highlights and develops local African American artists and encourages them to pursue their artistic passions.
- Spectrum School of the Arts & Gallery offers art classes and exhibits the work of member artists.
- Racine Art Guild promotes creative art for the mutual benefit of members and to advance the appreciation of art in Racine.
- Racine Camera Club helps local photographers improve the quality of their images and learn new techniques, along with holding photographic exhibits and contests.
- Lighthouse Quilters Guild promotes the art of quilt making and related textile areas.

== Galleries ==
- Art Metals Studio is a store and gallery in downtown Racine featuring custom designed jewelry.
- Artist's Gallery is a cooperative of 40 regional artists located in downtown Racine.
- Mahogany Gallery is a gallery, cultural center and creative space in Uptown Racine dedicated to educating, exhibiting and exploring the diaspora of Black American artists, literature and history. It is one of only a handful of Black-owned bookstores in Wisconsin.
- Northern Lights Gallery in downtown Racine features fine art, photography, limited edition prints, ceramics, blown glass, sculpture and jewelry.
- OS Projects is a contemporary art gallery in downtown Racine featuring visual artists from the Chicago-Kenosha-Racine-Milwaukee urban corridor in solo and small group exhibits.
- Photographic Design Gallery displays photographs by the owners, along with shows by visiting artists in various media.

== Music organizations ==
- Belle City Brassworks performs concerts in Racine and Kenosha that showcase guest artists.
- Belle Ensemble, a professional vocal chamber music ensemble, was founded in 2015 with funding from a Racine Arts Council ArtSeed grant. Their repertoire covers a diversity of European and American choral works, performed for audiences at Racine and Kenosha venues.
- Choral Arts Society of Southeastern Wisconsin is an auditioned community chorus of between 60 and 70 singers who perform master choral works and present musical outreach programs. The CAS's repertoire includes major classical choral works, operettas, show tunes, gospel, and original works by contemporary composers.
- Kilties Drum and Bugle Corps are an all-age co-ed drum and bugle corps that focuses on education and mentorship. The Kilties perform each year throughout the country in drum corps shows, parades, concerts and exhibitions.
- Racine Concert Band has been offering free public concerts for over 90 consecutive seasons. Mark Eichner, the band's director, says "We're committed to the great American tradition of family-friendly outdoor concerts in the style of the famous Sousa band."
- Racine Symphony Orchestra performs five to six concerts per year, three pops concerts, two to three Masterworks concerts, and an annual concert for fifth graders.
- Spirit of Racine Music Makers is an ensemble of musicians, vocalists, hand bell and chime ringers that endeavors to bring peace, social justice and love to the world through music.
- The Dairy Statesmen is a men's a capella show chorus that performs a variety of music, from standards to barbershop music, in the Racine area.

== Concert series ==
- Animal Crackers Concert Series presents four summer concerts featuring national and international recording artists performing in a wide variety of jazz genres, from traditional to hybrid forms. The concerts are held at the Racine Zoo.
- Blank-Fest Wisconsin is an offshoot of Blank-Fest New York, which was created to help the city's homeless population. Musicians donate their time to perform, and audience members bring a blanket in lieu of a ticket. Blankets are then distributed to the area's homeless.
- Bluegrass Music Festival is an annual 2-day festival that promotes the authentic bluegrass sound and features regional and national musicians. Proceeds from the festival support area non-profits.
- Dan Jam Music Festival was started in 2009 to honor the memory of Daniel Conner, who died in a car accident at a young age. The music festival features a range of music, from rock to jazz to hip hop, as well as spoken word performers. Proceeds from the concert benefit area social service organizations.
- Jean's Jazz Series: Presents a range of jazz styles through four events each year in a small performance space with good acoustics.
- Music on the Monument is downtown Racine's summer concert series. Weekly concerts by local bands playing a range of music take place from June through August at downtown's centrally located Monument Square.
- Music and More Concert Series: Concerts are held at noon on Thursdays during the summer at First Presbyterian Church in downtown Racine. Local and regional performers are invited to share their talents. Donations collected through a free will offering are then given to area non-profits.
- Thoughts for Food is a yearly multi-venue concert that benefits the Racine County Food Bank. Local, regional and national acts donate their time and talents to perform at area bars and other performance venues in and near downtown.
- Tribute to Bix Beiderbecke Jazz Festival is an annual, four-day event that honors the memory of 1920's era jazz cornetist, Bix Biederbecke. In addition to live jazz performances, the festival offers lectures, record and book sales, midnight jam sessions, dancing and jazz film screenings.

== Dance ==
- The Studio of Classical Dance Arts is a professional ballet school. The studio's purpose is to provide professional ballet instruction and performing opportunities for students throughout southeastern Wisconsin and northern Illinois.
- Sweatshop Movement is a dance production and instruction organization whose mission is to further and foster legitimate hip hop and dance training for youth, in an accessible way.
- Academy of Dance offers classes in ballet, pointe, tap and jazz to children, teens and adults in their downtown Racine studio.
- Guy Singer Dance Studio provides lessons in ballet, tap, jazz, ballroom and Latin dance for ages 3 and up. The studio also hosts Zumba fitness classes.
- Metamorphosis Arts is a dance studio in downtown Racine that teaches classes and workshops in pole fitness and dance, aerial silks and lyra, belly dancing, burlesque, yoga and circus fitness.

== Special events ==
- 16th Street Studios Annual Open House is held the first Saturday in December, when over 40 visual artists invite the public to tour their work spaces in the Racine Business Center.
- The Vital Art Project, curated by visual artist Mimi Peterson, combines local, regional and national artists in temporary exhibitions held in various venues throughout Racine.
- Snowdance 10 Minute Comedy Festival is a playwriting contest in which audience members determine the winning plays. Entries for the contest come from all over the world.
- Monument Square Art Festival: One of Wisconsin's oldest juried fine art fairs hosts artists from around the country exhibiting painting, photography, jewelry, sculpture, ceramics and mixed media.
- Starving Artists Fair is an outdoor art fair organized by the Racine Art Guild.
- Downtown Racine First Fridays is a downtown-wide celebration that takes place the first Friday of every month from April through December. Shops, galleries and museums stay open late during the event, which also features musical entertainment, carriage rides and free admission to the Racine Art Museum.
- Party on the Pavement is an annual event that is Racine's biggest street festival, including live music and art events.
- Root River Festival aims to celebrate the cultures and resources that have shaped Racine. The Festival includes musical entertainment, theater, outdoor activities, community workshops and a showcase for area nonprofits.
- The Origins of Hip Hop is an annual event in August exploring the culture of hip hop. It focuses on the five primary elements of hip hop culture: DJing, emceeing, graffiti art, breakdancing/all-styles hip-hop dancing and knowledge.
- Breakfast With the Authors is an annual event that brings different Wisconsin authors to Racine to read from and discuss their work. The event is hosted by The Friends of the Racine Public Library. Each author gives a presentation about their work and life as an author, and the audience then has the opportunity to ask them questions. Past authors that have participated include Carole Barrowman and Michael Perry (author).

== Artist workspaces ==
- Racine Business Center/16th Street Studios is a 4-story Cream City brick building renting space for a mix of businesses and art studios. Rentals to artists began in 1996 and have grown to over 60 artists.
- Mitchell Wagon Factory Lofts is a former factory converted to loft apartments that can be used as artist work spaces. The developer called it "live-work lofts for the creative class."
- Black-Eyed Press is a collaborative print shop and book arts studio for independent artists who join as members.
- Hot Shop Glass Studio and Gallery is a glass-blowing studio and gallery, that also offers short workshops that teach this ancient practice.

== Recording studios ==
- Belle City Sound offers professional recording, producing, mixing and mastering services to area musicians.

== Performance venues ==
- Racine Civic Centre: Memorial Hall and Festival Hall
- Racine Theatre Guild
- Sixth Street Theatre
- Golden Rondelle Theater
- Racine Masonic Center
- The DeKoven Center
- Racine Eagles Club

== Funding opportunities ==
- RAM Artist Fellowships. Four $3,000 Artist Fellowships and one $1,500 Emerging Artist Award are selected every two years, and recipients are given solo exhibits. Artists at all stages of their careers who are creating outstanding work in a variety of media are eligible for the Artist Fellowships, and artists under 40 who demonstrate significant potential are eligible for the Emerging Artist Award.
- Racine Arts Council ArtSeed Program: The purpose of ArtSeed is to encourage and enhance the arts in the Racine area and to foster excitement, support and growth in the arts. ArtSeed provides grants to projects that are new, innovative, experimental and collaborative.
- Racine Writer in Residence Program seeks to spotlight Racine and Kenosha’s literary community while encouraging, supporting, and advocating on behalf of writers at all stages of their careers. Two 6-month residencies are awarded each year. Writers in residence receive a stipend of $1,500, hold regular public hours and write a weekly blog post and complete a community project.
- Racine/Kenosha Poet Laureate Program encourages creative expression and literacy, while celebrating the power and beauty of language.

== Publications ==
- Racine Journal Times Get Out and About is a weekly print section of the Racine Journal Times focused on local arts and culture events.
- Straylight Magazine is the literary magazine of the University of Wisconsin-Parkside.
- The Root Magazine is an arts and culture publication where University of Wisconsin-Parkside photography students use their creativity to help showcase local businesses.

== Online calendars ==
- Real Racine
- Racine Journal Times Calendar
