= Huli =

Huli may refer to:

- Huli (dish), a lentil-based dish, also called Sambar, common in South India and Sri Lanka
- Huli people, indigenous people in Papua New Guinea
- Huli language, language of Huli people
- Huli District, district in Xiamen, Fujian, China
- Huli jing, fox spirits in China
- Huli, Meichuan, a village in Meichuan, Wuxue, Huanggang, Hubei, China
- Capsize, or Huli in Polynesian language (used worldwide in outrigger canoeing), boat or ship turned on its side or overturned.

== See also ==
- Huli-huli chicken
- Holi (disambiguation)
