= Chocolate malt =

Chocolate malt can refer to:

- Chocolate malt, a mash ingredient
- Malted milk
- Milkshake
