= John Horlick =

John Horlick may refer to:

- John Van Horlick, ice hockey player
- John Horlick of the Horlick baronets
