= Panjiri =

Traditional Indian Ayurvedic sweet

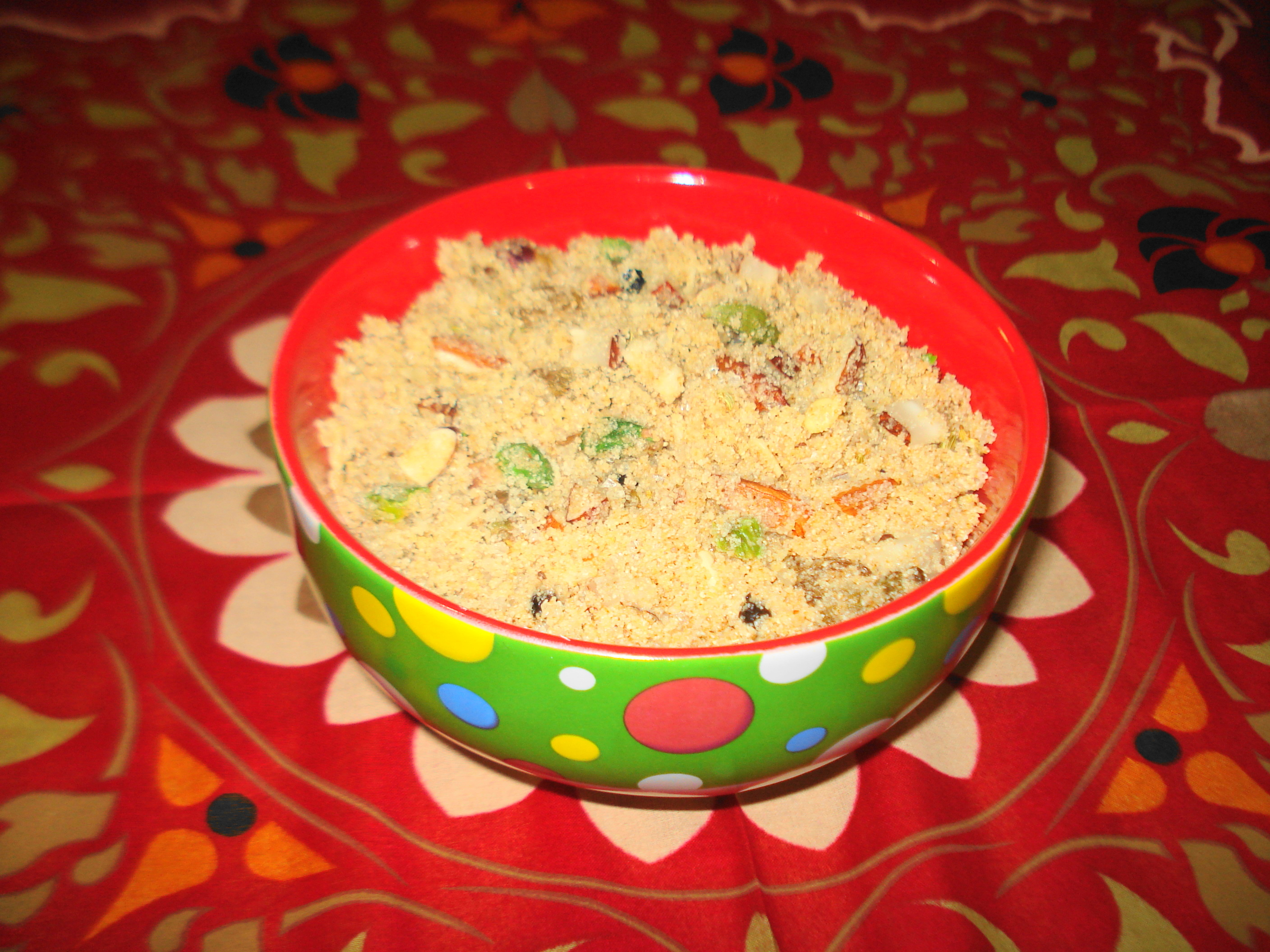
- Alternative names: Kasaar
- Course: Dessert
- Place of origin: India
- Main ingredients: Whole-wheat flour, sugar, ghee, dried fruits, herbal gums

Panjiri is a sweet dish from India which is specially prepared for Krishna Janmashtami festival. The sweet panjiri evolved from an Ayurvedic preparation called Panchajīraka.

== Etymology ==
The term panjīrī is derived from Sanskrit word panchajīraka which is an Ayurvedic preparation. The term panchajīraka is ultimately from Sanskrit elements panch (five) and jīraka (cumin or herbal ingredients here). Panjiri is prepared by roasting wheat flour in ghee and adding dry fruits and spices like jeera (cumin), dhaniya (coriander), saunth (dry ginger powder), saunf (fennel) etc. Alternatively, the term panjeri is also used in Rajasthani dialects.Similarly, term pañjarī is used in Marathi and Gujarati languages. As per The Molesworth Marathi and English Dictionary, Pañjarī is sweetmeat composed of five ingredients, viz. ginger, coriander, ōṃvā or Ajwaen, pepper (or cocoanut), and sugar. Distributed on birthdays of Kṛṣṇa & Rāma and of children.

== Regions of use ==
Panjiri is consumed in Indian states of Jammu, Himachal Pradesh, Punjab, Haryana, Rajasthan, Gujarat, Maharashtra, Bihar, Uttarakhand and Uttar Pradesh. It is known by the name Panchjeeraka Gudam in Southern Indian states.

== Cultural uses ==
Panjiri is traditionally prepared in the entire Northern, Central and Western India, and is often prepared as a Prasad in Hindu prayers during Krishna Janamashtami Satyanarayan Puja. and Bhagavata Purana Katha. The Braj region in Uttar Pradesh is specially known for its traditional Panjiri prepared during Krishna Janamashtami festival. In Braj culinary tradition, Panjiri is prepared as a special bhog to commemorate birth of Lord Krishna. Apart from this, Panjiri is also prepared as an offering to Devtas on occasions like Shanti Puja, Havan, Trayodashi Vrats, Navratri Vrats, Dussehra, Janamdivas (birthdays) and other events in the Panchang, i.e. Hindu Lunisolar calendar.

== Variations ==
=== Phalahari dhaniya panjiri ===
This Panjiri is prepared using Dhaniya, i.e. coriander seeds and is specifically prepared for Vrat. The wheat flour panjiri is replaced with Dhaniya Panjiri because consuming grains is generally not allowed during fasting, hence this dish is prepared with the powder of coriander seeds, ghee, sugar, almonds and raisins.

=== Pushtimargiya panjiri ===
This special variant of Panjiri is associated with Pushtimarg Sampradaya of Vaishnavism. Panjiri forms one of the 56 dishes of the Chhapan Bhog for Bhagwan Shrinathji, form of Bhagwan Krishna. This Panjiri is prepared as a Naivedhya for Shrinathji. The main ingredients used include : Variyali (fennel), Ajmo (carom), Dhanna (coriander), sunthi (dry ginger), pepper flakes and gari (dry coconut).

=== Dogra sund panjiri ===
In Jammu region, a special variation of Panjiri is prepared for winter season & Janamashtami Vrat and is called Sund Panjiri. This variation is prepared using lots of dry ginger powder (sund in Dogri) and is loaded with dry fruits native to hills of Jammu division.

=== Rajasthani gond panjiri ===
In Rajasthan, Panjiri or Panjeri is prepared using edible gum (also known as Gond locally). The mixture is used to prepare laddus out of it.

=== Mathura's panchamrit panjiri ===
This particular variation of panjiri is prepared using atta (wheat flour) as a Prashad for Satyanarayan Puja. Tulasi leaves (holy basil leaves) are also added to the mixture. It is served along with Charnamrit (a yogurt based sweet drink) and is associated with Braj region.

=== Phool makhana panjiri ===
It is prepared using phool makhanas (foxnuts) and is specially associated with Bihari cuisine.

== See also ==
- Satyanarayan Puja
- Krishna Janamashtami
- Malted milk
- Horlicks
