= Henry Bruton (auctioneer) =

British businessman

Henry Bruton was an auctioneer and the founder of the firm now known as Bruton Knowles.

In 1862, Henry Bruton moved to Gloucester, England and formed the estate agents and auctioneers Bruton, Knowles & Co. in partnership with William Knowles.

His sons were Henry Bruton and the member of Parliament for Gloucester Sir James Bruton.
