= Holi (disambiguation) =

Holi is a spring festival, also known as the festival of colours or the festival of love.

Holi may also refer to:

- Holi (1940 film), a 1940 Hindi/Urdu social drama film
- Holi (1984 film), an Indian coming of age drama film directed by Ketan Mehta
- Holi (2002 film), an Indian Telugu film, directed by SVN Vara Prasad
- Holi (singer), alias of Akiko Kobayashi, Japanese singer, songwriter, composer and arranger

== See also ==
- Holi, Punjab, Holi in the Punjab region
- Holika, a demoness in Hinduism associated with Holika Dahan
- Holika Dahan, a festival preceding Holi
- Antti Hölli (born 1987), Finnish ice hockey player
- Holika, a demoness in Hindu Vedic scriptures
- Holík, a surname (including a list of people with the name)
