= Memorial Hall (Racine, Wisconsin) =

- U.S. National Register of Historic Places
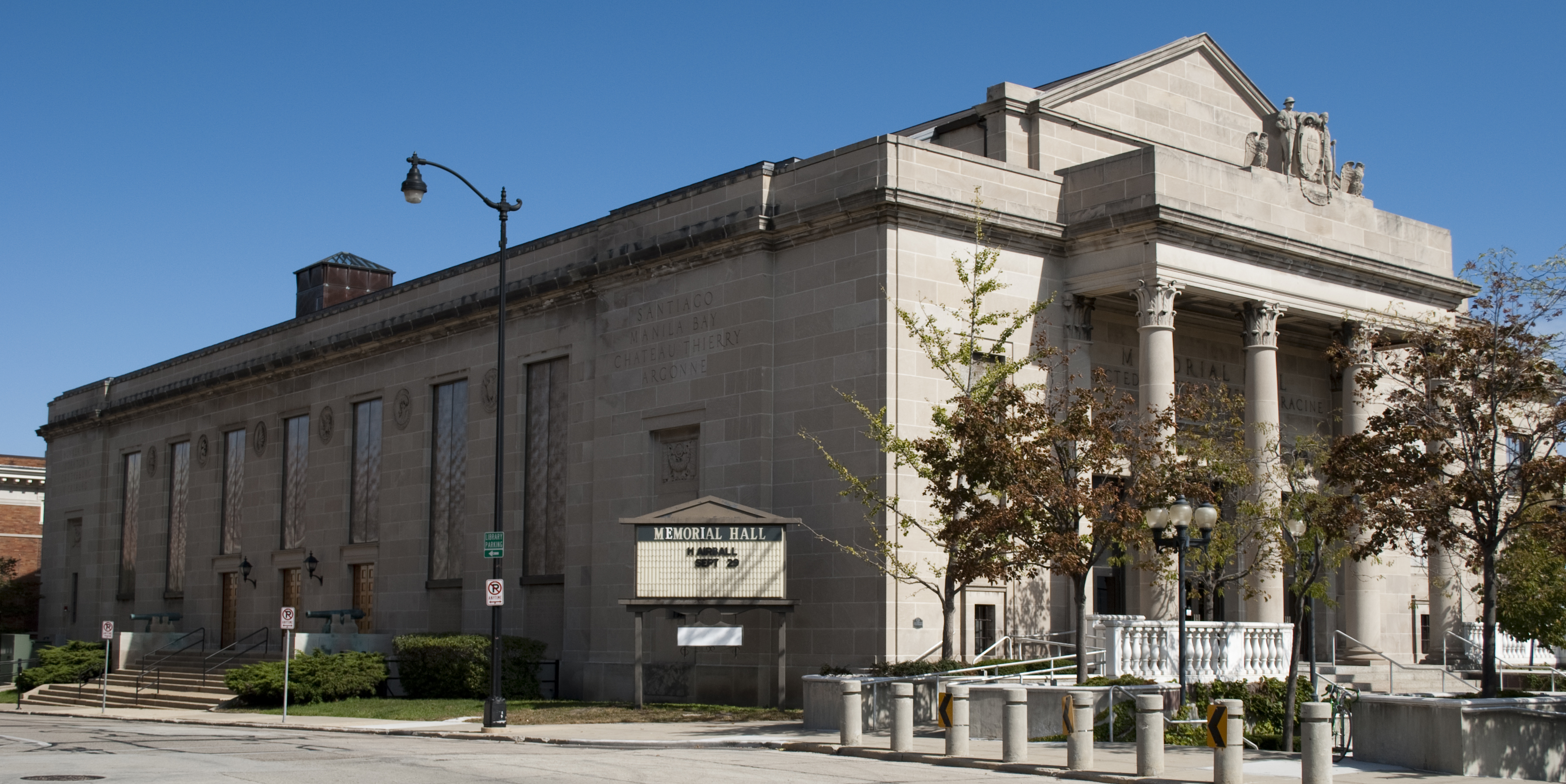

- Location within Wisconsin Location within the United States
- Coordinates: 42°43′33″N 87°46′51″W
- Architect: Howard Van Doren Shaw
- Architectural style: Classical revival
- NRHP reference No.: 80000177
- Added to NRHP: 10 April 1980

Memorial Hall is a convention and meeting hall built in 1924–25 in downtown Racine, Wisconsin. It is operated by the Racine Civic Center. It was given to the city as a gift by William Horlick, the co-inventor of malted milk. The hall has played host to Barack Obama, John McCain, and others.

The structure is a 2-story auditorium designed by Chicago architect Howard Van Doren Shaw in Neoclassical style, with a 176x118 foot footprint. The front entrance is sheltered by a 2-story raised portico whose four Corinthian columns support an entablature. The hall was built in memory of war dead. Names of famous battles are inscribed on the west facade and above the auditorium doors is inscribed "The Noblest Motive is the Public Good."

Beginning in 2016, Memorial Hall also hosts the Racine Storm, a basketball team in the Premier Basketball League.
