= Hollick =

Hollick is a surname. Notable people with the surname include:

- Arthur Hollick (1857–1933), American paleobotanist
- Clive Hollick, Baron Hollick (born 1945), British businessman with media interests, supporter of the Labour party
- Frederick Hollick (1818–1900), American physician, sex educator, and author
- Helen Hollick (born 1953), British author of historical fiction
- Herbert Hollick-Kenyon (1897–1975), aircraft pilot who made significant contributions towards aviation in Antarctica
- Michael Hollick (born 1973), American actor
- Philip Hollick (1936–1991), cricketer who played for both Ireland and the USA
- Ruth Hollick (1883–1977), Australian photographer
- Sue Woodford-Hollick, Lady Hollick (born 1945), businesswoman and consultant, wife of Clive Hollick

== See also ==
- Hollick-Kenyon, Edmonton, residential neighbourhood located in north east Edmonton, Alberta, Canada
- Hollick-Kenyon Peninsula, ice-covered spur from the main mountain mass of the Antarctic Peninsula
- Hollick-Kenyon Plateau, large, relatively featureless snow plateau, 1,200 m to 1,800 m above sea level
