= Art Kores =

American baseball player (1886–1974)

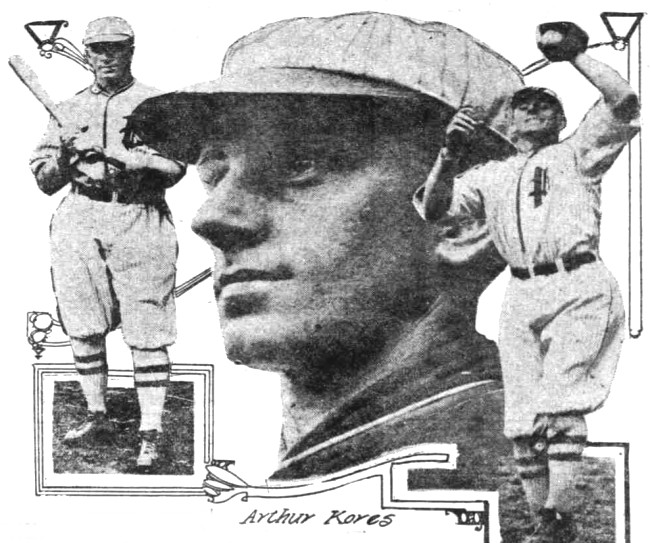
- Kores as a member of the Portland Beavers
- Third baseman
- Born: July 22, 1886; Milwaukee, Wisconsin, U.S.
- Died: March 26, 1974 (aged 87); Milwaukee, Wisconsin, U.S.
- Batted: Right Threw: Right

MLB debut
- July 24, 1915, for the St. Louis Terriers

Last MLB appearance
- October 3, 1915, for the St. Louis Terriers

MLB statistics
- Batting average: .234
- Home runs: 1
- Runs batted in: 22
- Stats at Baseball Reference

Teams
- St. Louis Terriers (1915)

Arthur Emil Kores (July 22, 1886 – March 26, 1974) was an American professional baseball player whose career spanned nine seasons, one of which was spent in Major League Baseball (MLB) with the St. Louis Terriers (1915). In the majors, he compiled a .234 batting average with 18 runs scored, 47 hits, nine doubles, two triples, one home run, and 22 runs batted in (RBIs) in 60 games played. He played all of his Major League games at third base. Kores played the majority of his career in the minor leagues with the Des Moines Boosters (1911–1912), Portland Beavers (1913–1914), Rochester Hustlers (1915), Nashville Volunteers (1916–1917), Louisville Colonels (1918), Toledo Mud Hens (1920), and Indianapolis Indians (1920). In the minors, he compiled a career .274 batting average with 1,225 hits, 212 doubles, 91 triples, and 29 home runs in 1,243 games played. Kores batted and threw right-handed. During his playing career, he stood at 5 feet 9 inches (175 cm) and weighed 167 pounds (76 kg).

== Early life ==
Kores was born on July 22, 1886, in Milwaukee to John and Theresa Kores, both of Bohemia. John Kores worked as a cabinet maker. Art Kores had five siblings; sisters Cecilia, and Josephine; and brothers Chas, Fred, and Joseph. Art Kores played semi-professional baseball, and sandlot ball in Milwaukee, before turning professional.

== Professional career ==
Kores' professional baseball career began in 1910 with the Racine Belles of the Class-C Wisconsin–Illinois League. He played just a month and a half with the Racine club, being used as a first baseman. Kores spent his first full professional season with the Des Moines Boosters of the Class-A Western League in 1911. With the Boosters, he batted .215 with 127 hits, 17 doubles, nine triples, and four home runs in 161 games played. Defensively, he played all of his games as a third baseman. After the season, Des Moines general manager Jack Holland attempted to trade Kores to another team, but no organization showed interest.

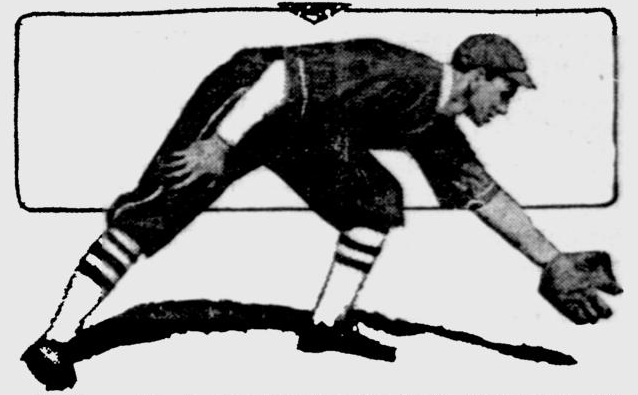
Kores played for the Portland Beavers for two seasons (1913–14).

The day before the Des Moines Boosters opening series of the 1912 season, Kores signed a new contract with the team. In his season debut, on April 19, Kores got three hits. With Des Moines that year, he batted .298 with 182 hits, 25 doubles, 10 triples, and 10 home runs in 162 games played. In the field, he played shortstop, committing 60 errors in 674 total chances. At the end of the 1912 season, the Portland Beavers of the Double-A Pacific Coast League drafted Kores from the Boosters. He was later drafted by the Chicago Cubs, but passed up the opportunity to play in Major League Baseball (MLB).

On March 1, 1913, Kores joined the Portland Beavers at their spring training camp in Visalia, California. He played 165 games with Portland that season, batting .282 with 24 doubles, eight triples, and five home runs. In the field, Kores played shortstop. At the start of the 1914 season, Kores was moved from shortstop to third base. During the season, The Milwaukee Journal described Kores as "the best clean-up hitter in the Coast league". With the Beavers that year, he batted .296 with 54 doubles, 21 triples, and five home runs in 187 games played. He led the Pacific Coast League in doubles, and triples that season. Kores was also third in the league in runs batted in (RBIs) with 94 that season.

In September, 1914, the New York Giants drafted Kores from the Portland Beavers in what the Oakland Tribune a "secret lottery". Kores rejected the Giants contract offer, stating that he could make as much money in the Pacific Coast League then he could in the majors. He demanded a US$2,100 a year salary from the Giants, which New York declined to give him. He eventually signed a contract with the Giants for an undisclosed amount. According to Beavers officials, Kores, who told the Giants he was only 23 years old, had to confess his real age to get the contract.

Before the 1915 season, it was reported that the St. Louis Terriers of the Federal League were interested in Kores, whose contract was owned by the New York Giants. At the start of the regular season, Giants manager John McGraw offered Kores' contract back to the Portland Beavers for a price of US$2,500, but Beavers manager Walter McCredie declined. Instead, McGraw sent Kores to the Double-A Rochester Hustlers of the International League. In 75 games with Rochester that year, he batted .275 with 76 hits, 11 doubles, 11 triples, and two home runs. On July 23, it was reported that Kores had left the Hustlers to join the Major League St. Louis Terriers. As a result, the Rochester club suspended him and fined him US$250. Officials from the Hustlers said that it did not come as a surprise that Kores had left the team, because he was in talks with the St. Louis club for months. Kores made his MLB debut on July 24, 1915. With St. Louis that season, he batted .234 with 18 runs scored, 47 hits, nine doubles, seven triples, one home run, and 22 RBIs in 60 games played. In the field, he played all of his games at third base, committing 10 errors in 251 total chances.

In 1916, the Federal League dissolved and the St. Louis Browns of the American League took over their operations. The Browns then sold Kores to the Class-A Nashville Volunteers of the Southern Association. With Nashville that season, he batted .275 with 117 hits, 21 doubles, and seven triples in 129 games played. In the field, he played third base. Kores re-signed with the Nashville Volunteers in 1917. That year, he batted .275 with 152 hits, 30 doubles, 13 triples, and two home runs in 154 games played. Defensively, he played all of his games at third base, committing 27 errors in 583 total chances. After the season, Kores joined a barnstorming team in Milwaukee.

Before the start of the 1918 season, Kores was sold from the Nashville Volunteers to the Louisville Colonels of the Double-A American Association. With Louisville, he batted .304 with 78 hits, 10 doubles, and seven triples in 71 games played. He played third base for the Colonels that season. After he completed his season with the Colonels, Kores signed with the semi-professional Lake Shore League. In 1919, he continued to play semi-pro baseball. He also injured his right arm that season. In late-March during the 1920 season, Kores signed with the Double-A Toledo Mud Hens of the American Association. Later that season, he joined the Indianapolis Indians, who were also members of the American Association. Between the two clubs, he batted .253 with 123 hits, 20 doubles, five triples, and one home run in 139 games played. He played all of his games at third base, committing 25 errors in 435 games played.

== Later life ==
After his baseball career, Kores settled in his home-town of Milwaukee, Wisconsin, with his wife Alma R. and their son Vernon T. Art Kores worked for a local oil company. He died on March 26, 1974, in Milwaukee. He was buried at Wisconsin Memorial Park in Brookfield, Wisconsin.
