= Racine Zoo =

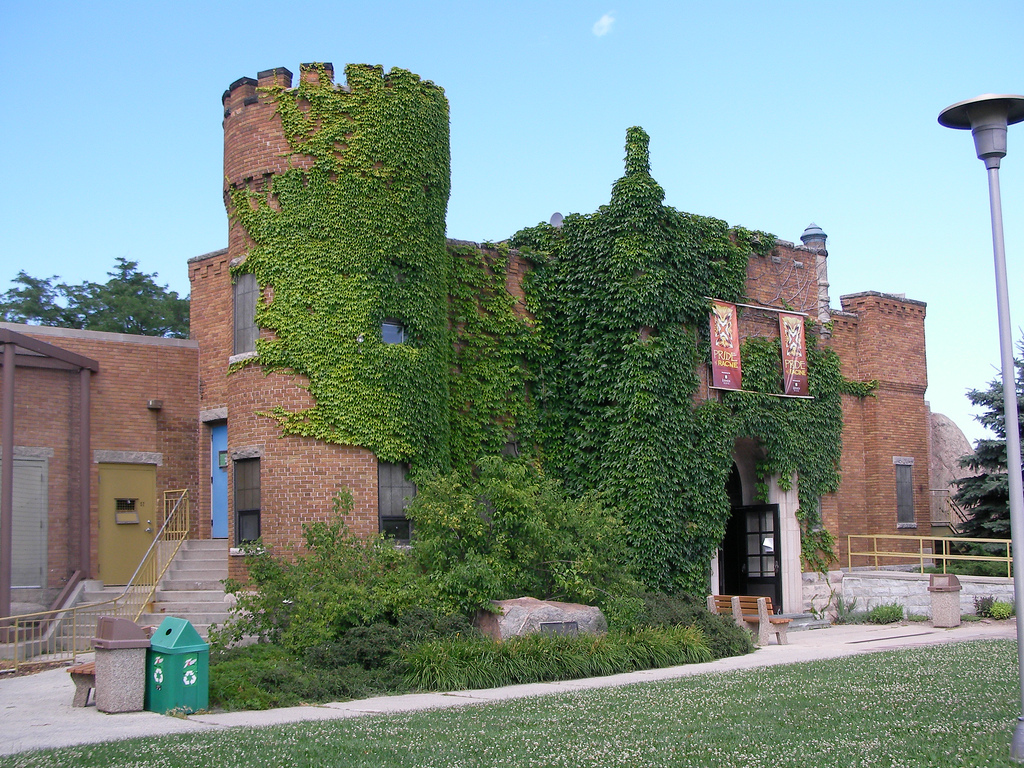
- The primate building
- Interactive map of Racine Zoo
- 42.7488°N 87.7837°W
- Date opened: 1923
- Location: Racine, Wisconsin, United States
- Land area: 32 acres (13 ha)
- Memberships: AZA
- Public transit: Ryde Racine
- Website: racinezoo.org

The Racine Zoological Gardens, or Racine Zoo, is a zoo situated on 32 acres (13 ha) on the shore of Lake Michigan in Racine, Wisconsin. The zoo is operated by the Racine Zoological Society, a non-profit organization. With more than 100 species of animals, the zoo's collection focuses on species native to Wisconsin, including a building dedicated to reptiles and amphibians that are indigenous to the state.

== History ==
The Racine Zoo was founded on March 1, 1923, by local businessman Jacob Stoffel, Jr. His donation of three monkeys spurred the city of Racine to build a small zoo in Island Park. By the end of that year, the zoo featured deer, badgers, gray foxes, and Rocky Mountain goats. After it outgrew the space, the zoo's current location at Goold Street and North Main Street, opened in 1925. The site had previously been part of Lakeview Park, which was a former brickyard.

The Racine Zoo quickly grew in its new location. Between 1925 and 1929, it added exhibits featuring sea lions, hoofed animals, and bears. A duck pond was created by flooding an abandoned clay quarry. During the Great Depression, the zoo's free admission allowed it to thrive while others were forced to close. The castle-like Vanishing Kingdom, which houses big cats and primates, was completed in 1939. It was built using bricks from the former county jail.

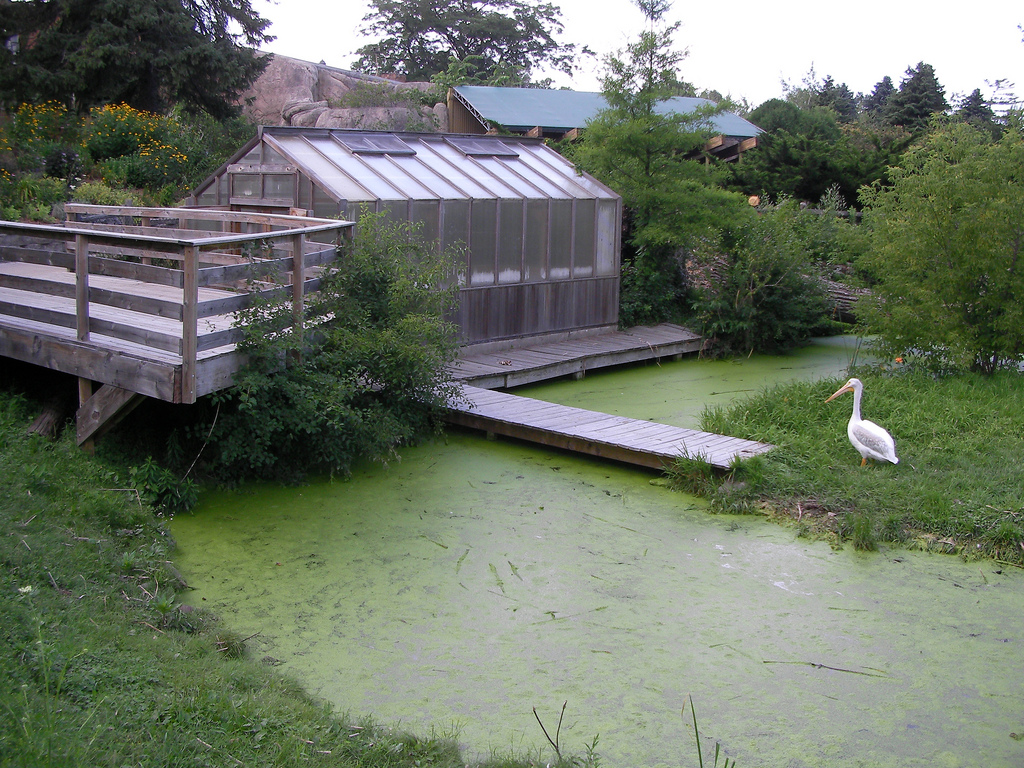
A walk-in enclosure at the Zoo

On May 23, 1958, Mary Heibner, a ten-year-old girl from Waukegan, Illinois, was mauled by a bear at the zoo. She nearly lost her right arm and required plastic surgery.

In November 1959, due to overcrowding, the Como Park Zoo relocated a two-year-old Siberian tiger to Racine. The Racine Zoo purchased the tiger, named Kahn, the following year.

On May 13, 1985, 35 ducks, geese and swans living in the zoo's duck pond were put down after the zoo was hit by a plague of duck viral enteritis.

In November of that year, the zoo became the host of the Kiwanis-Wheary Lights, an annual holiday light display. The lights were the creation of George H. and Jessie May Wheary, who held the display at their home in North Bay from 1962 to 1982. The lights were shown in Monument Square until Kiwanis became the owner of the lights.

The Australian division of S.C. Johnson & Son, whose headquarters are in Racine, gifted six kangaroos and six wallaroos to the zoo in 1987. Australian ambassador Rawdon Dalrymple attended the ceremony.

In the early 1990s, the Racine Zoo was both praised and criticized for its "old-fashioned" style of keeping animals, in small barred cages where zoo visitors could get unusually close to them. The City of Racine paid for about half of the zoo's $3 million renovation efforts in 1992, replacing the habitats which were at that time mostly unchanged from the zoo's original construction in the 1930s.

In May 1996, the zoo acquired Moon Shadow, a seven-year-old Asian snow leopard. The leopard died in December.

The zoo operated as a free-admission attraction until January 1, 2007, when fiscal needs required the introduction of an admission fee.

On February 10, 2011, Julie, the oldest patas monkey in recorded history, died at the Racine Zoo, where she had been born and spent almost all of her life. She was euthanized at the age of 28.

On October 1, 2019, the Racine Zoo partnered with Zigong Lantern Group in order to hold its first annual lantern festival – the largest event the zoo had ever undertook. The festival included over 300 hand-made lanterns and featured a 140-foot dragon.

== Animals ==
The Racine Zoo features animals from all over the world.

=== Birds ===
- African penguin
- Bald eagle
- Budgerigar
- Emu
- Great horned owl
- Lesser adjutant stork
- Red-tailed hawk
- Tawny frogmouth
- Western screech-owl
- White cockatoo
- Yellow-crowned amazon

=== Herptiles (amphibians and reptiles) ===
- Amazon tree boa
- Central bearded dragon
- Colombian red-tailed boa constrictor
- Green tree python
- Mission golden-eyed tree frog
- New Caledonian giant gecko
- Ornate box turtle
- Prehensile-tailed skink
- Sudan plated lizard
- Tokay gecko
- Western fox snake
- (American alligator, Andean milk snake, Kenyan sand boa, Mojave desert tortoise and are kept off general public display for the zoo's education programs. Tiger salamanders are also kept for education displays)

=== Mammals ===
- African lion
- Alpaca
- Amur tiger
- Arctic fox
- Black-handed spider monkey
- Bornean orangutan
- Canada lynx
- Common wallaroo
- Domestic ferret
- Domestic goat
- Domestic sheep
- Eastern black rhinoceros
- Emperor tamarin
- Fennec fox
- Fossa
- Hartmann's mountain zebra
- Masai giraffe
- Meerkat
- Red kangaroo
- Straw-colored fruit bat
- Tufted deer
- Western gray kangaroo
- White-handed gibbon

=== Other animals ===
- Asian forest scorpion
- Brazilian salmon pink bird-eating tarantula
- Madagascar hissing cockroach
- Red zebra cichlid

The zoo's grounds are also home to a playground, a children's zoo, and a hands-on discovery center; free Sunday band concerts and the Animal Crackers Jazz Series are held during the summer.
