= Henry Bruton =

English businessman (1843–1920)

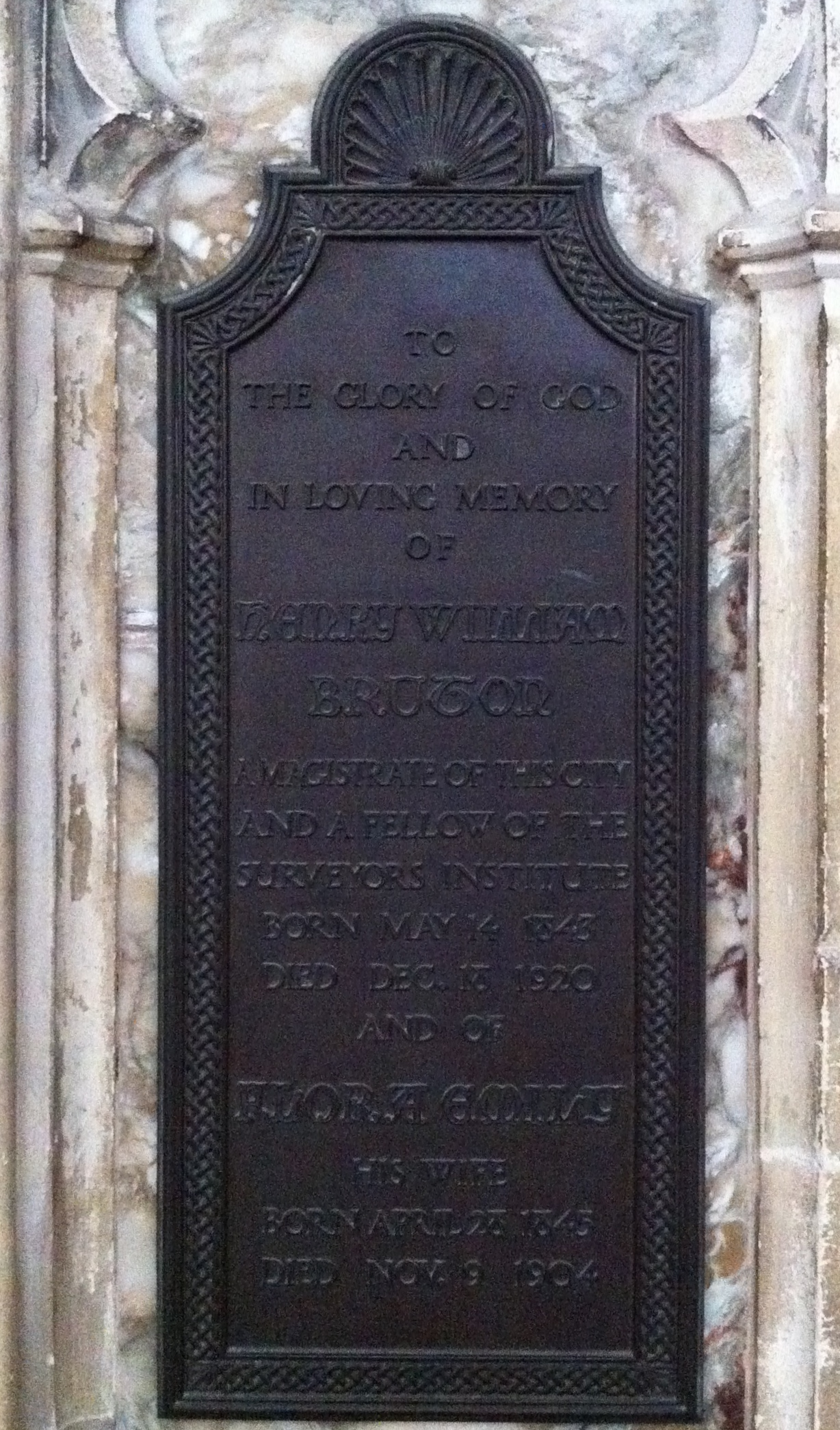
Memorial to Henry Bruton in Gloucester Cathedral

Henry William Bruton (14 May 1843 – 18 December 1920) was a Gloucester businessman who was a key figure in the development of the city during the later part of the nineteenth century and the early twentieth century. He was born in Newent, Gloucestershire, on 14 May 1843, the son of Henry Bruton Snr.

== Professional life ==
In 1862, Bruton's father moved to Gloucester and formed the estate agents and auctioneers Bruton, Knowles & Co. in partnership with William Knowles. Henry Jr. joined the firm in 1864 and became a partner in 1870. He was largely responsible for the development of the weekly Gloucester livestock market from 1871 but he was also involved in the sales of Chepstow Castle, Tintern Abbey and Cowley Manor. He was a director of the Gloucester Gas Light Company.

== Other activities ==
Bruton held numerous public and voluntary offices. He was a Justice of the Peace, a Freemason, a City Councillor, member of the School Board and the Public Library Committee. He was a regular churchgoer and was once Churchwarden of St. Mark's in Gloucester. Bruton's interests also included William Thackeray and Charles Dickens and he was Vice President of the Dickens Fellowship. Bruton was a founding member of The Bristol and Gloucestershire Archaeological Society and the Gloucester Rotary Club. He collected mezzotints.

== Family ==
Bruton's younger brother was Sir James Bruton (born 1848), who was the Member of Parliament for Gloucester from 1918 to 1923. In 1871, Bruton married Flora Emily Tew Smith and they had six sons and six daughters. One daughter died in 1894 and a son, Basil, was killed in Italy during the First World War whilst serving with the Gloucestershire Regiment. Flora died in 1904. Bruton was buried with her at Matson. There is a photograph of Basil in the Imperial War Museum Catalogue, available on line .

== Legacy ==
The firm founded by Bruton's father, and which he successfully expanded, continues in business as Bruton Knowles Property Consultants and Bruton Way in Gloucester marks the family name.
