= Island Park (Racine, Wisconsin) =

Coordinates: 42°43′50″N 87°48′10″W

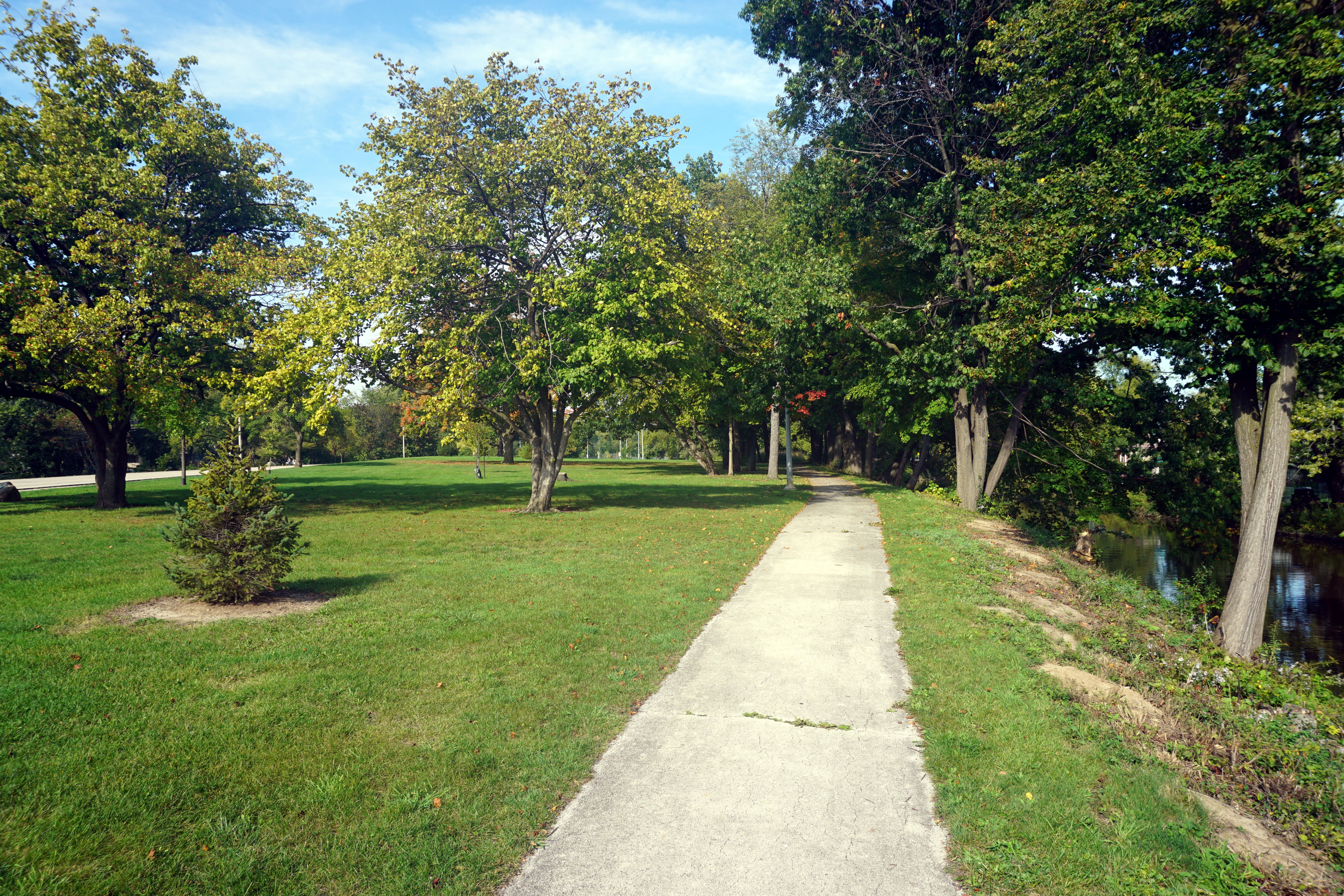
Island Park

Island Park or Horlick Park is a neighborhood park covering 19 acres (0.077 km^{2}) of land in Racine, Wisconsin.

== Location ==
The park is located on an island, surrounded on both sides by the Root River. The land for the park was donated by William Horlick, the inventor of malted milk.
