= Vladimír Holík =

Czech ice hockey defenceman

- Born: February 27, 1978 (age 47); Opava, Czechoslovakia
- Height: 6 ft 0 in (183 cm)
- Weight: 198 lb (90 kg; 14 st 2 lb)
- Position: Defence
- Shot: Left
- Played for: HC Slezan Opava; HC Havířov; HC Znojemští Orli; HC Vítkovice; Brest Albatros Hockey
- Playing career: 1997–2017

Vladimír Holík (born February 27, 1978) is a Czech former professional ice hockey defenceman.

Holík played in the Czech Extraliga for HC Slezan Opava, HC Havířov, HC Znojemští Orli and HC Vítkovice. He also played in the British National League for the Edinburgh Capitals, the Slovak 1. Liga for HC '05 Banská Bystrica and in France for seven years with Brest Albatros Hockey and Sangliers Arvernes de Clermont.

== Career statistics ==
			Regular season					Playoffs
Season	Team	League	GP	G	A	Pts	PIM	GP	G	A	Pts	PIM
1997–98	HC Slezan Opava	Czech	20	0	1	1	10	—	—	—	—	—
1998–99	HC Slezan Opava	Czech	30	2	1	3	4	—	—	—	—	—
1999–00	HC Havirov	Czech	16	0	1	1	2	—	—	—	—	—
1999–00	HC Sumperk	Czech2	8	0	1	1	33	—	—	—	—	—
1999–00	HC Slezan Opava	Czech2	13	0	3	3	18	4	0	1	1	2
2000–01	HC Znojemsti Orli	Czech	29	3	2	5	8	7	0	1	1	25
2000–01	HC Ytong Brno	Czech2	11	3	3	6	12	—	—	—	—	—
2001–02	HC Znojemsti Orli	Czech	41	1	2	3	24	4	0	1	1	12
2002–03	Edinburgh Capitals	BNL	35	2	24	26	18	6	1	1	2	0
2003–04	HC Benatky nad Jizerou	Czech3	10	1	2	3	10	—	—	—	—	—
2003–04	HC Sareza Ostrava	Czech3	7	1	3	4	6	12	0	1	1	14
2004–05	HC Sareza Ostrava	Czech2	46	0	11	11	40	3	0	0	0	4
2005–06	HC Sareza Ostrava	Czech2	47	1	3	4	24	—	—	—	—	—
2006–07	HC Vitkovice Steel	Czech	4	0	0	0	4	—	—	—	—	—
2006–07	HC Sareza Ostrava	Czech2	46	2	9	11	28	6	0	0	0	8
2007–08	HC Sareza Ostrava	Czech2	34	0	10	10	57	—	—	—	—	—
2007–08	HC Banska Bystrica	Slovak2	6	2	5	7	4	14	3	1	4	26
2008–09	HC Poruba	Czech2	27	2	3	5	12	—	—	—	—	—
2009–10	Albatros de Brest	France2	26	3	14	17	30	6	0	6	6	4
2010–11	Albatros de Brest	France2	26	7	19	26	38	6	1	0	1	8
2011–12	Albatros de Brest	France2	26	4	13	17	18	4	0	0	0	8
2012–13	Albatros de Brest	France2	26	8	16	24	24	6	0	3	3	0
2013–14	Albatros de Brest	France	24	2	6	8	16	—	—	—	—	—
2014–15	Albatros de Brest	France	26	2	5	7	28	3	2	0	2	0
2015–16	Hockey Clermont Communauté Auvergne	France3	13	7	11	18	4	5	1	5	6	31
2016–17	HC Slezan Ostrava	Czech3	35	5	14	19	28	5	1	2	3	0
Czech totals			140	6	7	13	52	11	0	2	2	37
Czech2 totals			232	8	43	51	224	23	1	5	6	30
