= Horlick Malted Milk Company Industrial Complex =

Historic factory complex in Racine, Wisconsin, US

- U.S. National Register of Historic Places
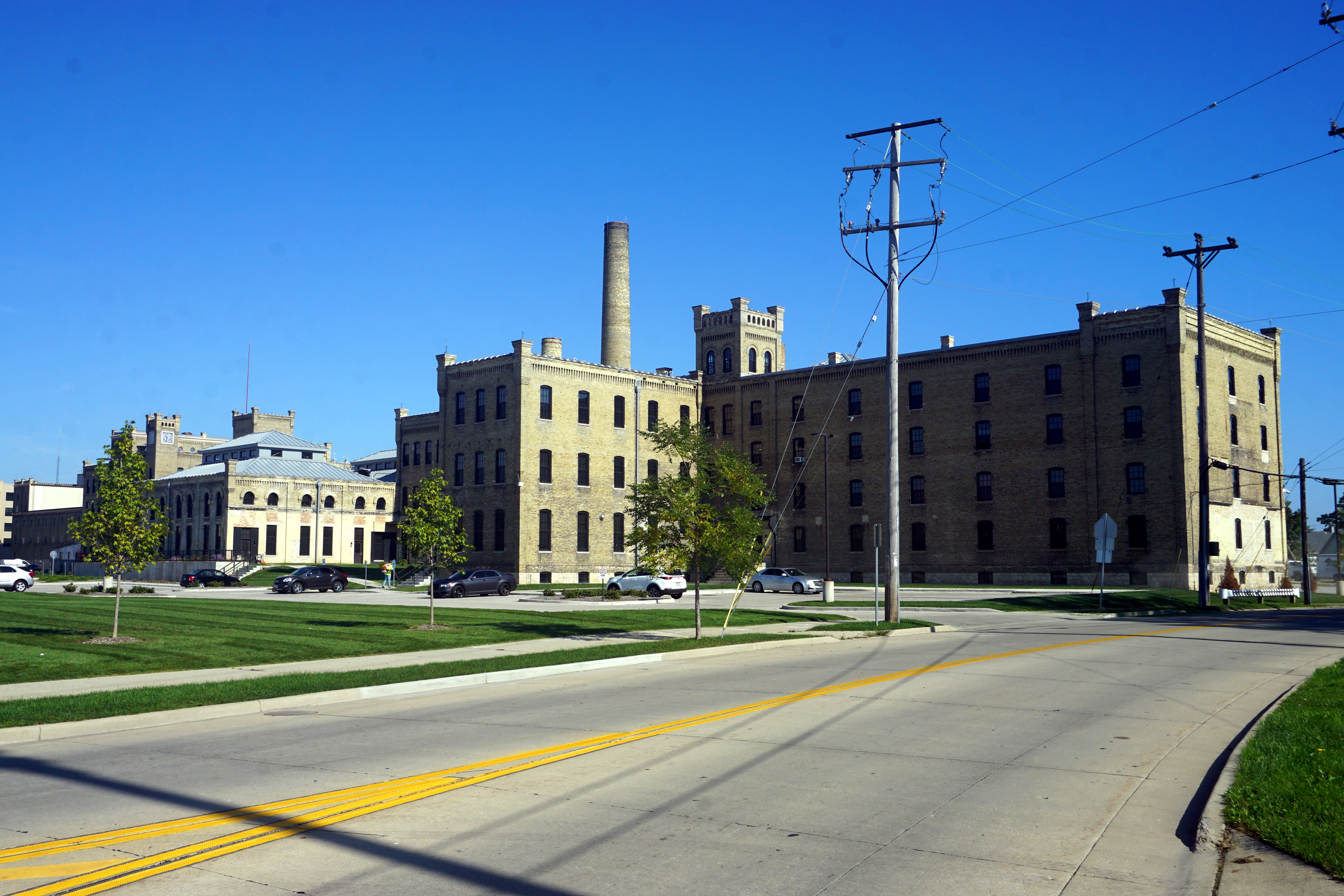

- Location within Wisconsin
- Location: 2100–2234 Northwestern Avenue; 1450–1500 Summit Avenue; Racine, Wisconsin
- Coordinates: 42.7382°N 87.8080°W
- Architect: James Corse & Sons
- NRHP reference No.: 100004988
- Added to NRHP: February 24, 2020

The Horlick Malted Milk Company Industrial Complex is a historic factory complex in Racine, Wisconsin, where Horlicks malted milk was produced. Four buildings within the complex are listed: the castle-like Gothic Revival-style factory blocks begun in 1882 and 1902, the 1910 engine room building, and the 1916 garage.

== Architecture ==
The Horlicks complex consisted of fourteen buildings, four of which are included in the National Register listing. The first Horlicks factory building built on the site, designed by James Corse & Sons in 1882, is a three-to-four-story industrial building built in a Gothic Revival style. The building, with cream brick walls typical of southeastern Wisconsin, features a clock tower and turrets which have led the building to become known as "Clock Tower Place" since Horlicks moved out. An addition on the north side of the building dates from 1910. A second factory block was added to the complex in 1902, following the same Gothic Revival design, with a single-story addition designed by John Randal McDonald in 1951. In 1910, a two-to-three-story engine room building was added to the growing complex, with a prominent smokestack and an elevated walkway connecting it to the factory buildings, and a two-story garage was added in 1916.

== Later history ==
Racine Hydraulics purchased the main Horlicks plant in 1951. Two other buildings at the complex were purchased by Western Publishing in 1955, and Western sold them to Racine Hydraulics in 1964. Horlicks, then owned by Beecham Group, continued to operate in the former engine room building until 1975.

J. Jeffers and Co., the owners of most of the Horlick complex, applied to add the complex to the National Register of Historic Places in October 2019. Jeffers had previously redeveloped the Gold Medal Camp Furniture Company building in Racine, which they had successfully had listed on the National Register. The four buildings were added to the Wisconsin State Register of Historic Places on November 22, 2019, and was subsequently listed on the National Register on February 24, 2020.

== See also ==
- National Register of Historic Places listings in Racine County, Wisconsin
