= Bill Fox (baseball) =

American baseball player (1872–1946)

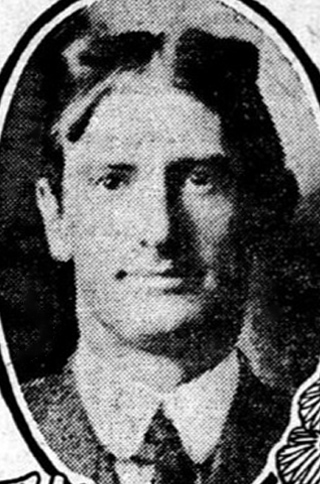
- Second baseman
- Born: January 15, 1872; Sturbridge, Massachusetts, U.S.
- Died: May 7, 1946 (aged 74); Minneapolis, Minnesota, U.S.
- Batted: Switch Threw: Right

MLB debut
- August 20, 1897, for the Washington Senators

Last MLB appearance
- September 12, 1901, for the Cincinnati Reds

MLB statistics
- Batting average: .185
- On-base percentage: .212
- Runs batted in: 7
- Stats at Baseball Reference

Teams
- Washington Senators (1897); Cincinnati Reds (1901)

William Henry Fox (January 15, 1872 – May 7, 1946) was an American Major League Baseball second baseman. He played for the Washington Senators in 1897 and the Cincinnati Reds in 1901. He also played at College of the Holy Cross. He played in the minor leagues from 1894 through 1913 and managed in 1908–1910, 1912–1913 and 1915.
