= James Bruton =

English politician 1848–1933

Sir James Bruton (1848 – 26 February 1933) was an English politician. He was elected member of Parliament for Gloucester for the Unionist Party in 1918 and 1922.

James Bruton was born in Newent, Gloucestershire, in 1848, the son of the auctioneer Henry Bruton. He was the elder brother of Henry Bruton junior (1843–1920). He was educated at The Crypt School in Gloucester.

He was knighted in 1916.
