= Larry Hoffman (baseball) =

American baseball player (1878-1948)

- Third baseman
- Born: July 18, 1878; Chicago, Illinois, U.S.
- Died: December 29, 1948 (aged 70); Chicago, Illinois, U.S.
- Batted: Right Threw: Right

MLB debut
- July 4, 1901, for the Chicago Orphans

Last MLB appearance
- July 9, 1901, for the Chicago Orphans

MLB statistics
- Batting average: .318
- Home runs: 0
- Runs batted in: 6
- Stats at Baseball Reference

Teams
- Chicago Orphans (1901)

Lawrence Charles Hoffman (July 18, 1878 – December 29, 1948) was an American third baseman in Major League Baseball. He played for the Chicago Orphans in 1901. He was born in Chicago, Illinois.
