= Philip Hollick =

Egyptian-born Irish American cricketer

Personal information
- Full name: Alexander Francis George Philip Hollick
- Born: 13 February 1936; Cairo, Egypt
- Died: 6 February 1991 (aged 54); Westminster, London, England
- Batting: Right-handed

International information
- National sides: Ireland; United States

Career statistics
Competition	First-class
Matches	1
Runs scored	0
Batting average	0.00
100s/50s	0/0
Top score	0
Catches/stumpings	1/–
- Source: CricketArchive, 23 January 2011

Alexander Francis George Philip Hollick (13 February 1936 – 6 February 1991), usually known as Philip Hollick, was a cricketer who played for both Ireland and the United States.

A right-handed batsman, Hollick made his debut for Ireland against Sussex in August 1956, scoring one run before being bowled. His second and final match for Ireland was against Scotland in July 1957 scoring a duck in both innings, in what was his only first-class match.

He later played one match for the US national side, against Canada in Montreal in September 1967. He scored one run in the first innings and top-scored in the second with 22 as the USA lost the match by five wickets.
