= Sir James Horlick, 1st Baronet =

Malted drink inventor

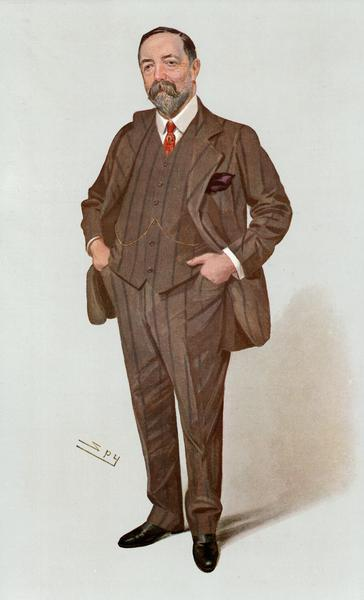
"Malted Milk", caricature by Spy in Vanity Fair, 1909.

Sir James Horlick, 1st Baronet DL (1844–1921) was, with his brother William (1846–1936), the co-founder of the malted drink Horlicks.

== Career ==
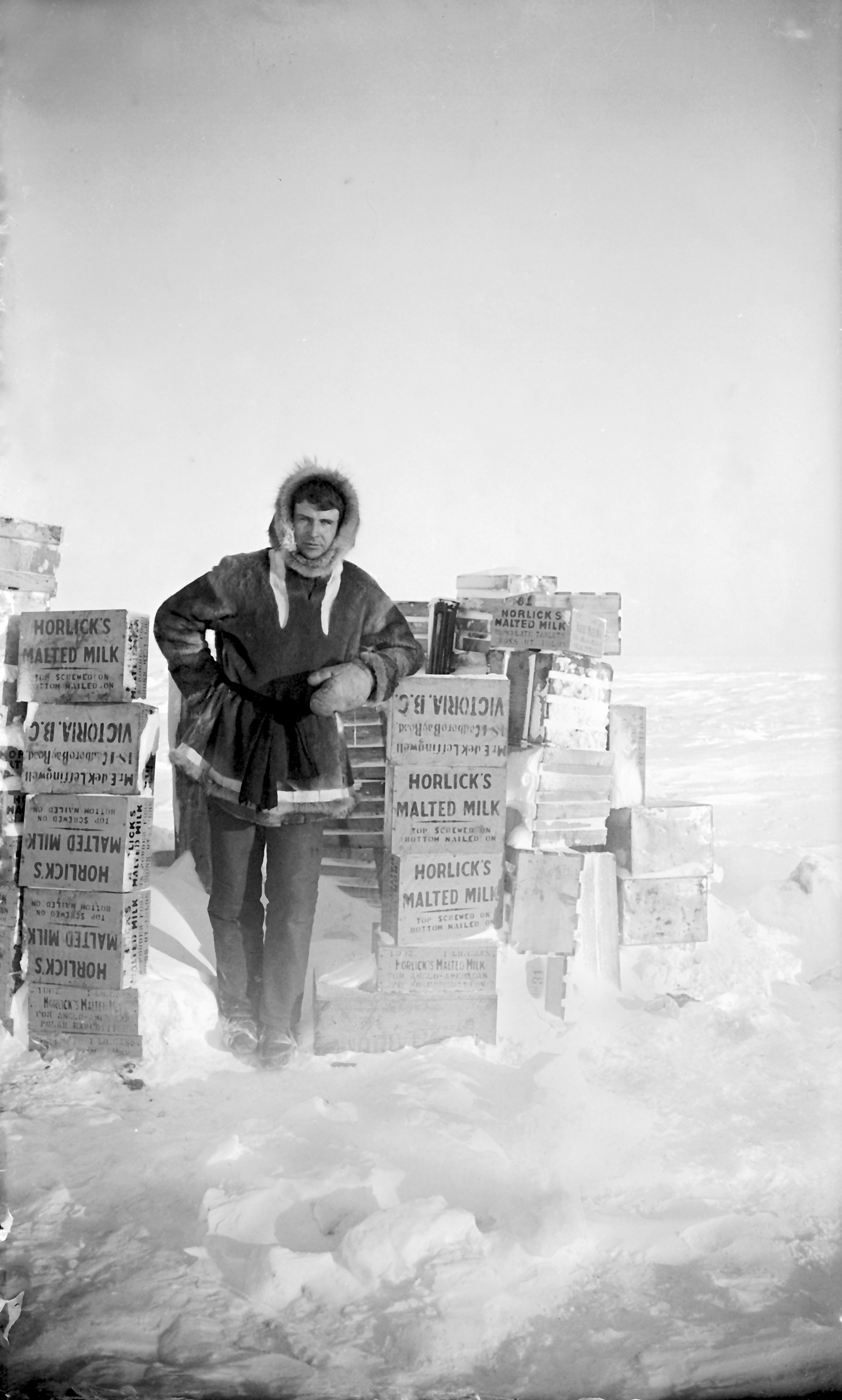
Explorer Ernest de Koven Leffingwell poses with cases of Horlick's Malted Milk on Flaxman Island, Alaska, c. 1910.

James Horlick, a pharmacist, carefully developed this product to be a complete nourishment formula for infants and invalids. Horlicks was a concentrated and easily digestible food drink, widely praised. The brothers were born at Ruardean in Gloucestershire. When they reached their late teens, both men went to London, where James joined a homeopathic chemist in Bond Street and William a saddler in Lisle Street, where he became a full-fledged mechanic. In 1869, William left for the US and worked for a year or two with a distant cousin in the quarrying business at Racine, Wisconsin. Meanwhile, James qualified as a pharmacist (also in 1869). Before leaving England in 1873, he was working on a dried infant food prepared from malt and bran to mix with milk and water. James could not raise the necessary capital to market and produce a new drink in London and so left to join his brother in America.

In 1873, he founded (along with his brother) the company J & W Horlicks in Chicago to manufacture a patented malted milk drink as an artificial infant food. Two years later, they moved the business to larger premises at Racine, Wisconsin, in part because of the availability of an abundant supply of spring water. In 1883, they secured U.S. patent 278,967 for first malted milk drink mixing powder with hot water. In 1890, James returned to London to set up an office for importing the U.S.-made product. In 1906, Slough was selected as site for new factory. In 1914, James was made a baronet. During World War I, his nutritional drink was popular both at home and in the overseas services.

James married Margaret Adelaide Burford in 1873. He died in 1921, the Horlick baronetcy being inherited by his eldest son, Ernest Horlick. His second son, James Nockells Horlick, became the 4th baronet in 1958. His third son, Gerald Horlick, died in Alexandria in 1918, following an injury in World War I.

Baronetage of the United Kingdom
New creation	Baronet (of Cowley Manor); 1914–1921	Succeeded by Ernest Horlick
