= John Van Horlick =

Canadian ice hockey player

- Born: February 19, 1949 (age 76); Vancouver, British Columbia, Canada
- Height: 6 ft 0 in (183 cm)
- Weight: 190 lb (86 kg; 13 st 8 lb)
- Position: Defence
- Shot: Left
- Played for: Toronto Toros
- Playing career: 1969–1977

John Van Horlick (born February 19, 1949) is a Canadian former professional ice hockey defenceman and coach. He played two games in World Hockey Association for the Toronto Toros during the 1975–76 season, registering zero points and twelve penalty minutes. He served as head coach for the New Westminster Bruins during the 1987–88 season.

== Career statistics ==
			Regular season					Playoffs
Season	Team	League	GP	G	A	Pts	PIM	GP	G	A	Pts	PIM
1967–68	Victoria Cougars	BCJHL	—	—	—	—	—	—	—	—	—	—
1968–69	Victoria Cougars	BCJHL	—	—	—	—	—	—	—	—	—	—
1969–70	Charlotte Checkers	EHL-Sr.	61	6	20	26	111	6	0	1	1	19
1970–71	Charlotte Checkers	EHL-Sr.	73	8	45	53	278	13	2	4	6	44
1971–72	Portland Buckaroos	WHL-Sr.	72	2	12	14	84	10	0	0	0	10
1972–73	Springfield Kings	AHL	49	4	7	11	145	—	—	—	—	—
1972–73	Portland Buckaroos	WHL-Sr.	25	1	3	4	98	—	—	—	—	—
1973–74	Springfield Kings	AHL	45	3	6	9	83	—	—	—	—	—
1973–74	Portland Buckaroos	WHL-Sr.	15	1	5	6	26	10	0	0	0	11
1974–75	Salt Lake Golden Eagles	CHL	4	0	1	1	5	—	—	—	—	—
1974–75	Omaha Knights	CHL	58	6	6	12	152	6	1	0	1	4
1975–76	Beauce Jaros	NAHL-Sr.	65	3	37	40	192	12	0	3	3	70
1975–76	Toronto Toros	WHA	2	0	0	0	12	—	—	—	—	—
1976–77	Trail Smoke Eaters	WIHL	—	0	14	14	121	—	—	—	—	—
WHA totals			2	0	0	0	12	—	—	—	—	—
AHL totals			94	7	13	20	228	—	—	—	—	—
