= Horlick baronets =

Baronetcy in the Baronetage of the United Kingdom

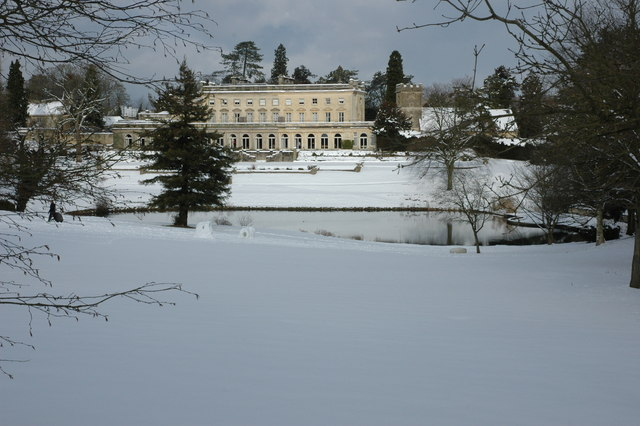
Cowley Manor, Gloucestershire

The Horlick Baronetcy, of Cowley Manor in the County of Gloucester, is a title in the Baronetage of the United Kingdom. It was created on 18 July 1914 for the pharmacist and businessman James Horlick, brother of William Horlick. He was chairman and president of Horlicks Ltd. The fourth Baronet represented Gloucester in the House of Commons from 1923 to 1929.

== Horlick baronets, of Cowley Manor (1914) ==
- Sir James Horlick, 1st Baronet (1844–1921)
- Sir Ernest Burford Horlick, 2nd Baronet (1880–1934)
- Sir Peter James Cunliffe Horlick, 3rd Baronet (1908–1958)
- Sir James Nockells Horlick, 4th Baronet (1886–1972)
- Sir John James Macdonald Horlick, 5th Baronet (1922–1995)
- Sir James Cunliffe William Horlick, 6th Baronet (born 1956)

The heir apparent is the present holder's son Alexander Horlick (born 1987).
