= Malted milk =

Powdered gruel with a malted flavor

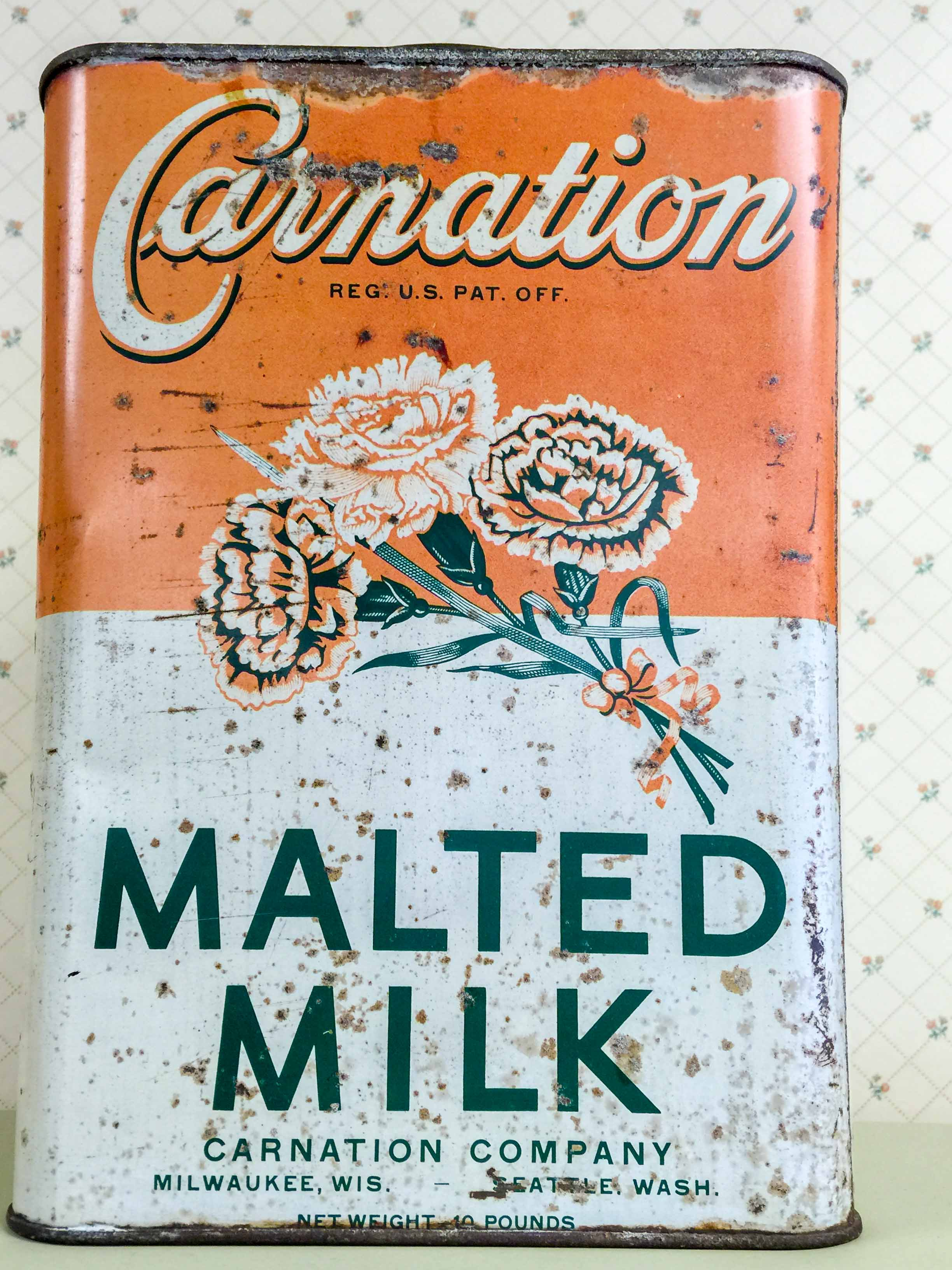
A Carnation-brand malted milk can

Malted milk, also known as malt powder or malted milk powder, is a powder made from a mixture of malted barley, wheat flour, and evaporated whole milk powder. The powder is used to add its distinctive flavor to beverages and other foods, but it is also used in baking to help dough cook properly.

== History ==
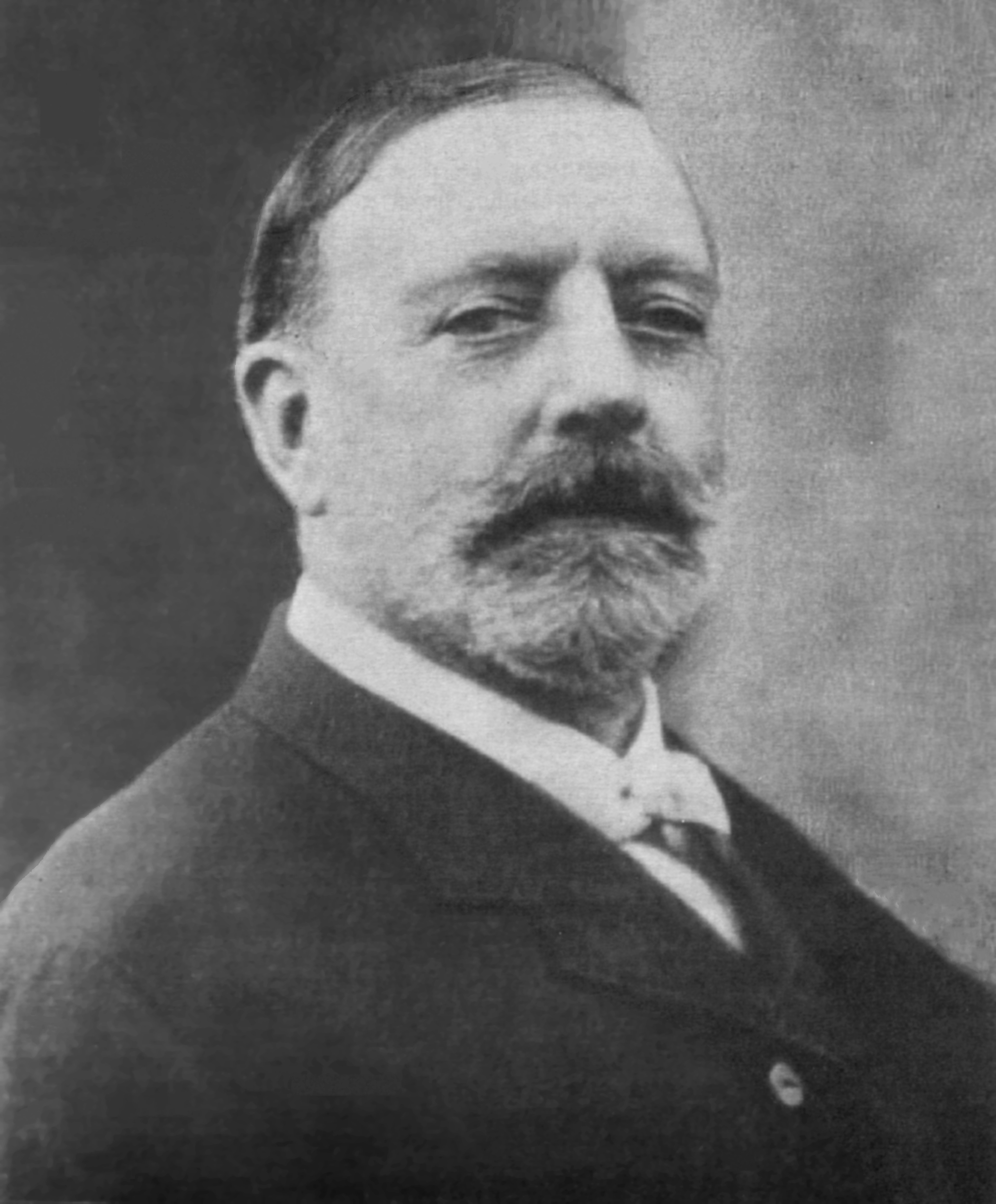
William Horlick

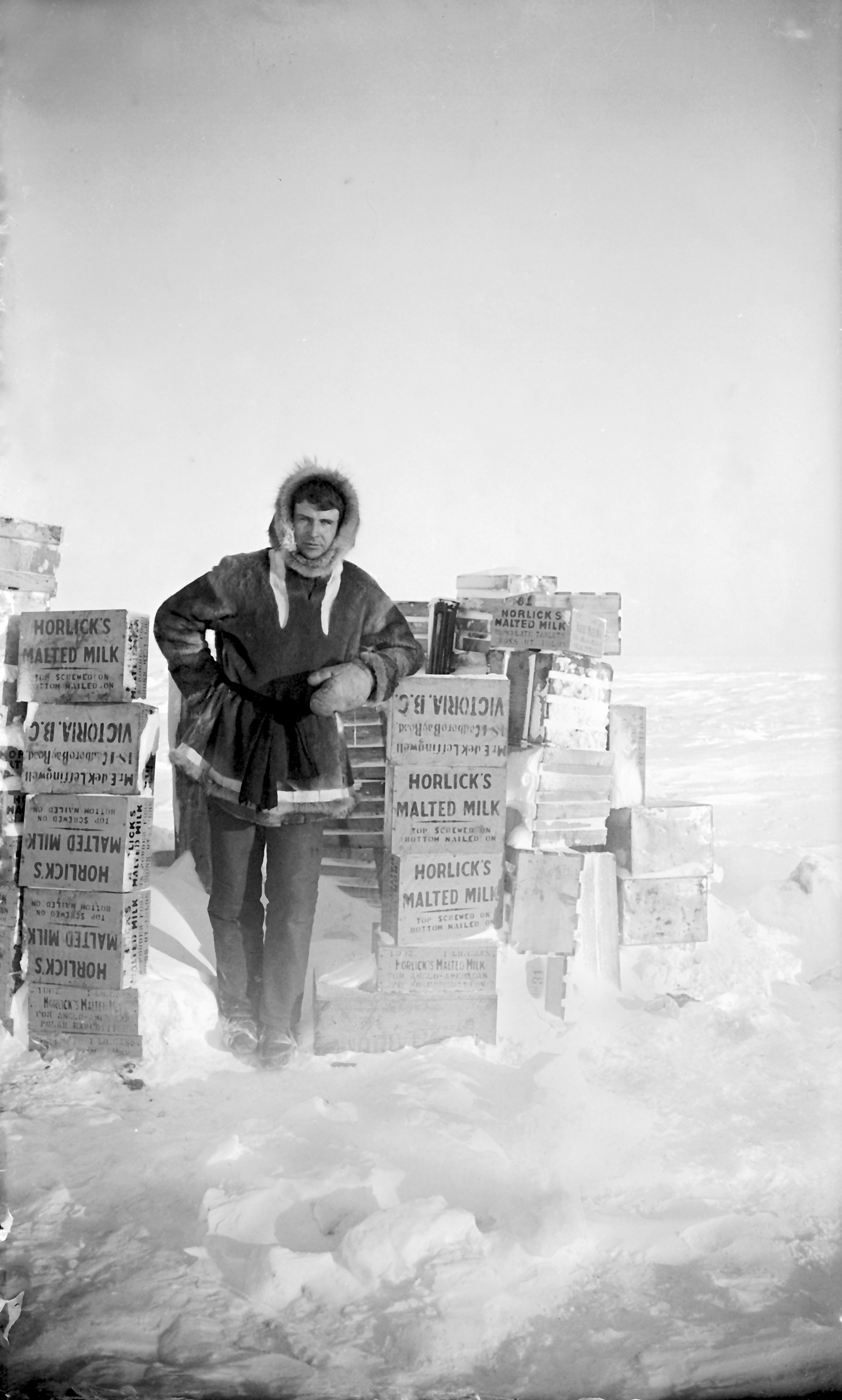
Explorer Ernest de Koven Leffingwell poses with cases of Horlick's Malted Milk on Flaxman Island, Alaska, circa 1910.

London pharmacist James Horlick developed ideas for an improved, wheat- and malt-based nutritional supplement for infants. Despairing of his opportunities in the United Kingdom, Horlick joined his brother William, who had gone to Racine, Wisconsin, in the United States, to work at a relative's quarry. In 1873, the brothers formed J & W Horlicks to manufacture their brand of infant food in nearby Chicago. Ten years later, they earned a patent for a new formula enhanced with dried milk. The company originally marketed its new product as "Diastoid", but trademarked the name "malted milk" in 1887.

Despite its origins as a health food for infants and invalids, malted milk found unexpected markets. Explorers appreciated its lightweight, nonperishable, nourishing qualities, and they took malted milk on treks worldwide. William Horlick became a patron of Antarctic exploration, and Admiral Richard E. Byrd named Horlick Mountains, a mountain range in Antarctica, after him. Back in the US, people began drinking Horlick's new beverage for enjoyment. James Horlick returned to England to import his American-made product and was eventually made a baronet. Malted milk became a standard offering at soda shops, and found greater popularity when mixed with ice cream in a "malt", for which malt shops were named.

== Uses ==
- Malted milk biscuits
- Malted milkshakes
- Malted thickshakes
- Malted soybean milk
- Malted hot drinks, such as Horlicks and Ovaltine
- Malted cold drinks, such as Milo
- Malted milk balls: malted milk is used in the candy confections Whoppers (manufactured by Hershey Co.), Mighty Malts (manufactured by Necco), and Maltesers (manufactured by Mars, Inc).
- Malted milk is used in some bagel recipes as a substitute for non-diastatic malt powder.

== See also ==
- Flavored milk
- List of barley-based drinks
- Nestlé Milo
- Panjiri
