= Horlicks =

Sweet malted milk hot drink powder

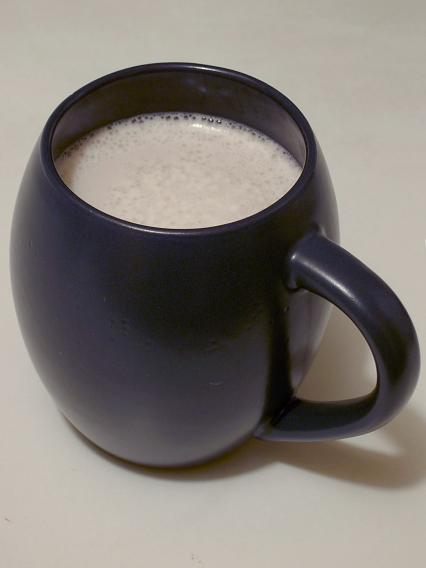
- A mug of Horlicks
- Type: Sweet malted drink
- Manufacturer: Aimia Foods (United Kingdom); Unilever (worldwide)
- Origin: United Kingdom
- Introduced: 1873; 153 years ago
- Related products: Milo; Ovaltine
- Website: horlicks.co.uk

Horlicks is a British sweet malted milk hot drink powder developed by founders James and William Horlick. It was first sold as "Horlick's Infant and Invalids Food", soon adding "aged and travellers" to their label. In the early 20th century, it was sold as a powdered meal replacement drink mix.

'Night starvation' was a fictitious condition invented by Horlicks as an advertising gimmick that was supposedly relieved if a mug of the malt drink was consumed before bedtime. In the comedy song "Goodness Gracious Me!", the doctor (Peter Sellers) humorously suggests "night starvation" as a possible ailment, though the real issue is that both characters are lovesick.

It was then marketed as a nutritional supplement and manufactured by GlaxoSmithKline (Consumer Healthcare) in Australia, Bangladesh, Hong Kong, India, Pakistan, Nepal, Thailand, Singapore, Jamaica, Malaysia, New Zealand, South Africa, Sri Lanka, and the United Kingdom. It is now produced by the Anglo-Dutch company Unilever through its Indian division. Horlicks in the UK is currently owned by Aimia Foods.

On 3 December 2018, Unilever announced they were buying Horlicks Indian business for US$3.8 billion. The Horlicks UK business had already been sold in 2017 to Aimia Foods, a UK-based subsidiary of Primo Water (formerly known as Cott Corporation). In Britain, Horlicks is commonly consumed before bedtime and marketed as an evening drink. In contrast, it is promoted as a breakfast drink in India, where it enjoys far greater popularity.

== Ingredients ==
The main ingredient in the United Kingdom formulation is a mixture of wheat flour, malted wheat (46%), followed by malted barley (26%). As of 2019, the other ingredients include dried whey, calcium carbonate, dried skimmed milk, sugar, palm oil, salt, Anti-Caking Agent (E551), and a mixture of vitamins and minerals. The palm oil used is non-hydrogenated and certified by the Roundtable on Sustainable Palm Oil. The formulation may vary slightly depending upon the country. For instance, the Indian formulation does not contain oil, but does contain soy protein isolate.

== Advertising ==
Horlicks was the sponsor of the Lum and Abner Show from 1934 to 1937.

March 1952 ad for Horlicks in 208, the magazine of Radio Luxembourg

Dan Dare, Pilot of the Future serial was a 1950s show sponsored by Horlicks and was aired Monday to Friday at 7:15 p.m. over Radio Luxembourg.

A commercial for Horlicks from 1935

In 1961, Horlicks ran a television advertising campaign that featured Scottish entertainer Billy Raymond and an actress. The theme of the advert was "Horlicks – the food drink of the night."

== Around the world ==
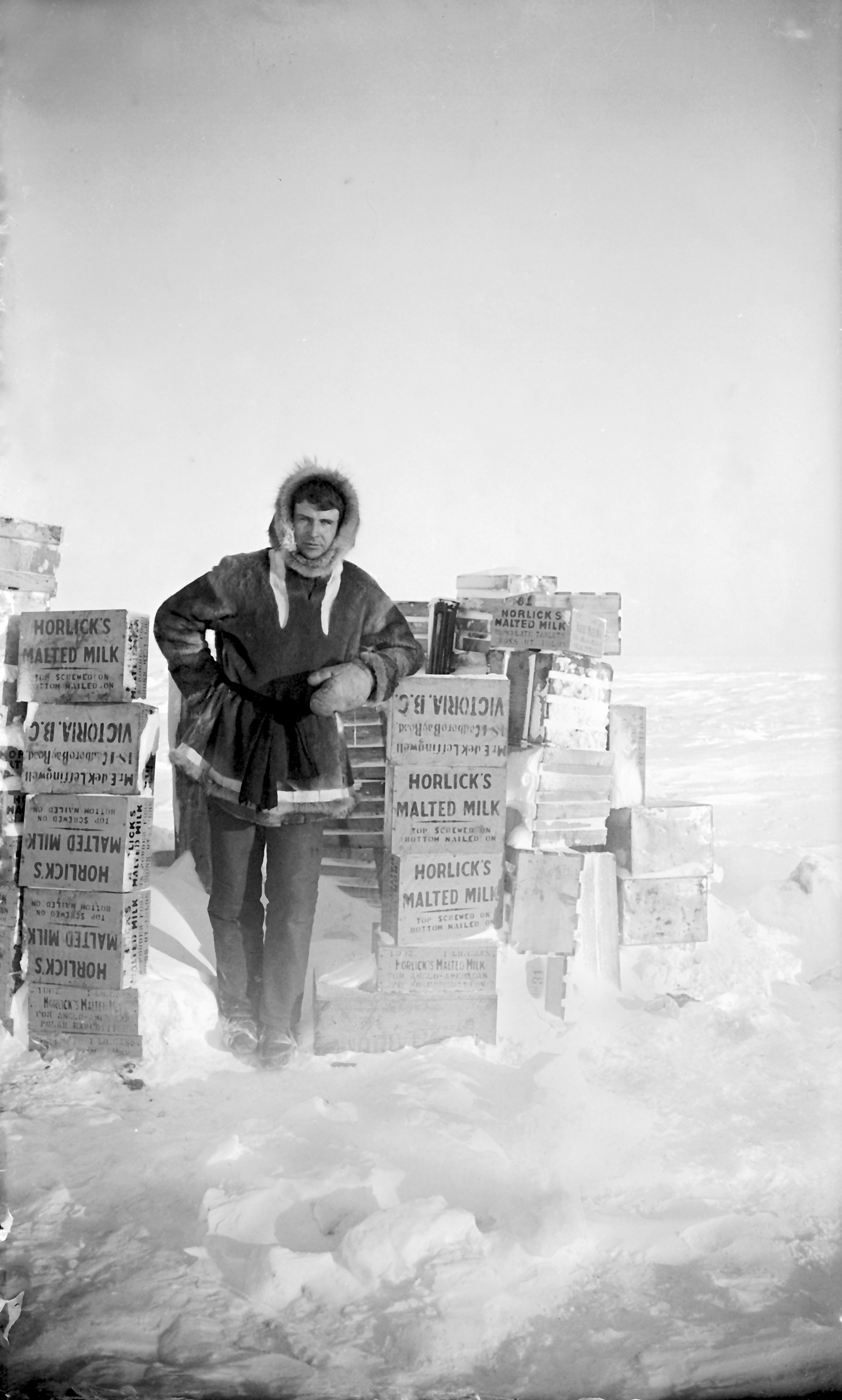
Explorer Ernest de Koven Leffingwell poses with cases of Horlick's Malted Milk on Flaxman Island, Alaska, c. 1910.

=== India ===
Horlicks came to India with the British Army; the end of World War I saw Indian soldiers of British Indian Army bringing it back with them as a dietary supplement. Punjab, Bengal and Madras Presidencies became early adopters of Horlicks and many well-to-do Indians took to drinking Horlicks as a family drink in early 1940s and 1950s. It became a sort of status symbol in upper middle class Indians and rich classes. The first flavour available in India, as in Britain, was malt.

India, where it has traditionally been marketed as The Great Family Nourisher, is the largest market for Horlicks. The Indian formulation for Horlicks is slightly different from that used in most other countries, as there it is manufactured from buffalo milk rather than cows milk. In 2003, the brand underwent a revamp which led to the introduction of new flavours such as vanilla, toffee, chocolate, honey, and elaichi (cardamom). The current line-up of flavours include original (malt), chocolate and elaichi. with the latest offering Horlicks Kesar Badaam added recently to the portfolio, providing a more specialized taste offering to the consumers.

In recent years, there has been an increase in the scope of the brand in India. By pushing it to newer segments of the market, Horlicks has become an umbrella brand for a wide variety of products ranging from the flagship malt drink to instant noodles, confectionery and breakfast cereal. Special formulations of the malted drink for young children (Junior Horlicks), breast-feeding mothers (Mother's Horlicks), women (Women's Horlicks) and adults (Lite Horlicks) exist. Horlicks biscuits were first launched in 1993, and an energy bar was launched in 2009, named Horlicks NutriBar. Also in late 2009, Foodles, a brand of instant noodles, was launched under the Horlicks umbrella. This was followed in 2011 by launches of Horlicks Gold, a premium variant of the malt drink (dubbed The Best Horlicks Ever), and Horlicks Oats, the first breakfast cereal product under the Horlicks brand.

In 2010, Horlicks accounted for 85% of the ₹23.06 billion (US$240 million) revenue of GlaxoSmithKline in India. In 2012 it was the most widely consumed packaged beverage in India, after bottled water.

The biggest branding event is Horlicks Wizkids. This event started its way in 2003 and till now has reached approximately 25 million children in all India as well as in Sri Lanka, Nepal and Bangladesh.

Ahaar Abhiyan is a Horlicks initiative to increase malnutrition-related awareness amongst mothers, families and communities. With the sale of every bottle of Horlicks, the company contributes ₹1 towards the initiative. The campaign attempts to raise awareness about proper nutrition amongst mothers of children aged between 3 and 6 years.

Horlicks Wizkids is an interschool cultural and literary competition for children from class 1 to 12. The competition attracts students from India, Sri Lanka, Nepal and Bangladesh. With more than 30 events in the field of arts, literature, painting and extra-curricular activities, Horlicks Wizkids is South Asia's largest interschool fiesta giving children an opportunity to showcase their talent on a global platform.

The 2013 Edition of Horlicks Wizkids South Asia was held in Bangalore. It consisted of five days of rigorous training sessions, talent rounds, project presentations and other fun, learning and recreational activities. More than 100,000 students from over 1,200 schools participated. Five students from Vizag, Jaipur, Delhi, Hyderabad and Bhubaneshwar earned the title of the Horlicks WizTeam 2013. The winners got an opportunity to go for a learning program to Germany and a cash award of ₹100,000 each.

=== Hong Kong ===
In Hong Kong, Horlicks is known better as a café drink than as a sleeping aid. It is served at cha chaan tengs as well as fast-food shops such as Café de Coral, Fairwood and Maxim's Express. It can be served hot or cold, and is usually sweetened with sugar. It is made with warm milk, and ice is added to it if a cold drink is desired.

=== Southeast Asia ===
In some Southeast Asian countries, such as the Philippines and Malaysia, Horlicks was also sold as milky-chocolate-flavoured discs in paper packets, which were then eaten as candy. Horlicks remains popular in Malaysia and Singapore where it packed under licence from SmithKline Beecham and sold in large glass and tin containers. It is also available in 1.5 kg refill packs. "Taller, stronger, sharper" is its slogan.

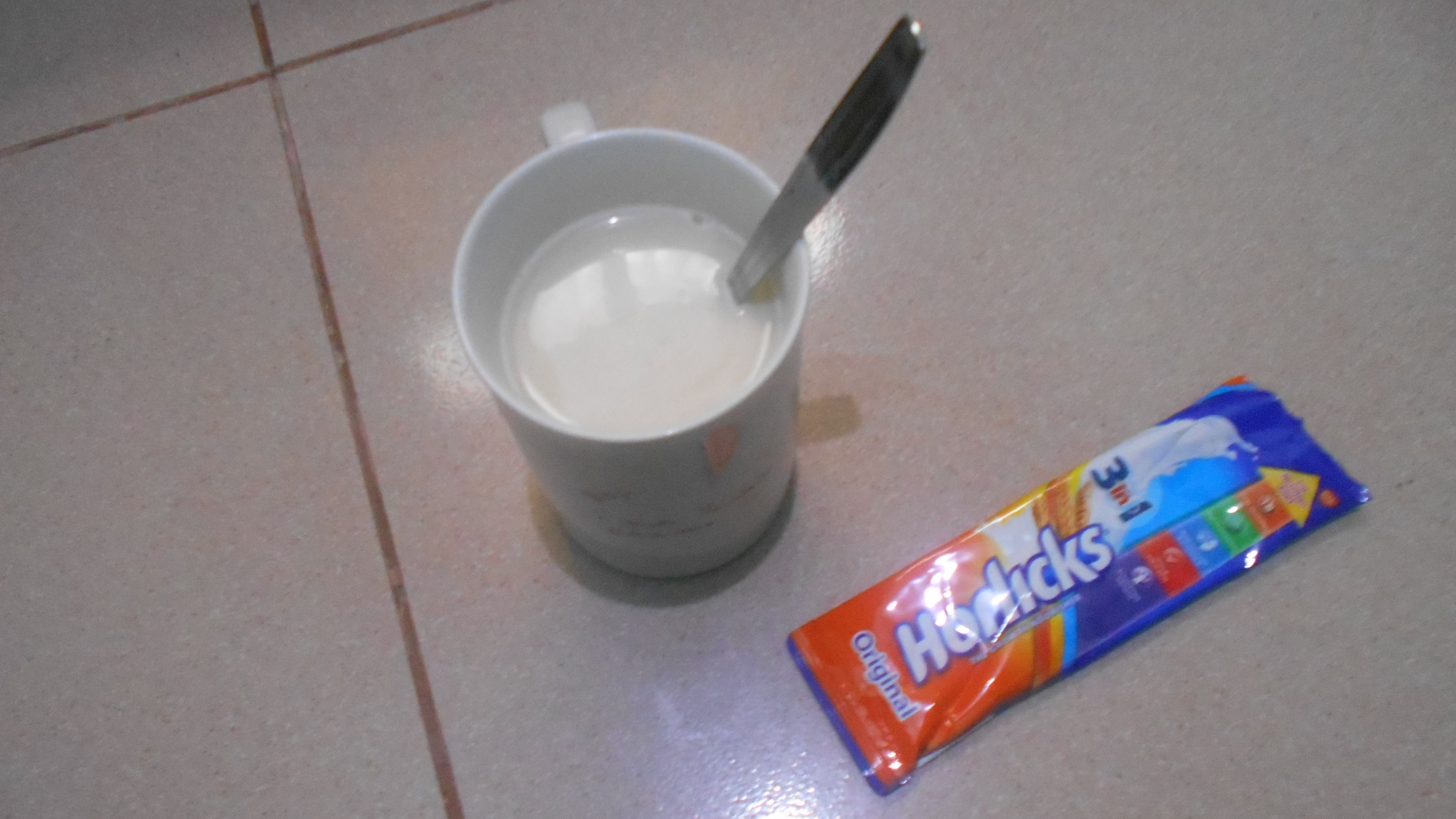
Horlicks in Indonesia

=== South Africa ===
Besides its use as a hot drink prepared with hot milk, Horlicks is also a popular ingredient in "honey and Horlicks" milkshakes in South Africa.

=== United Kingdom ===
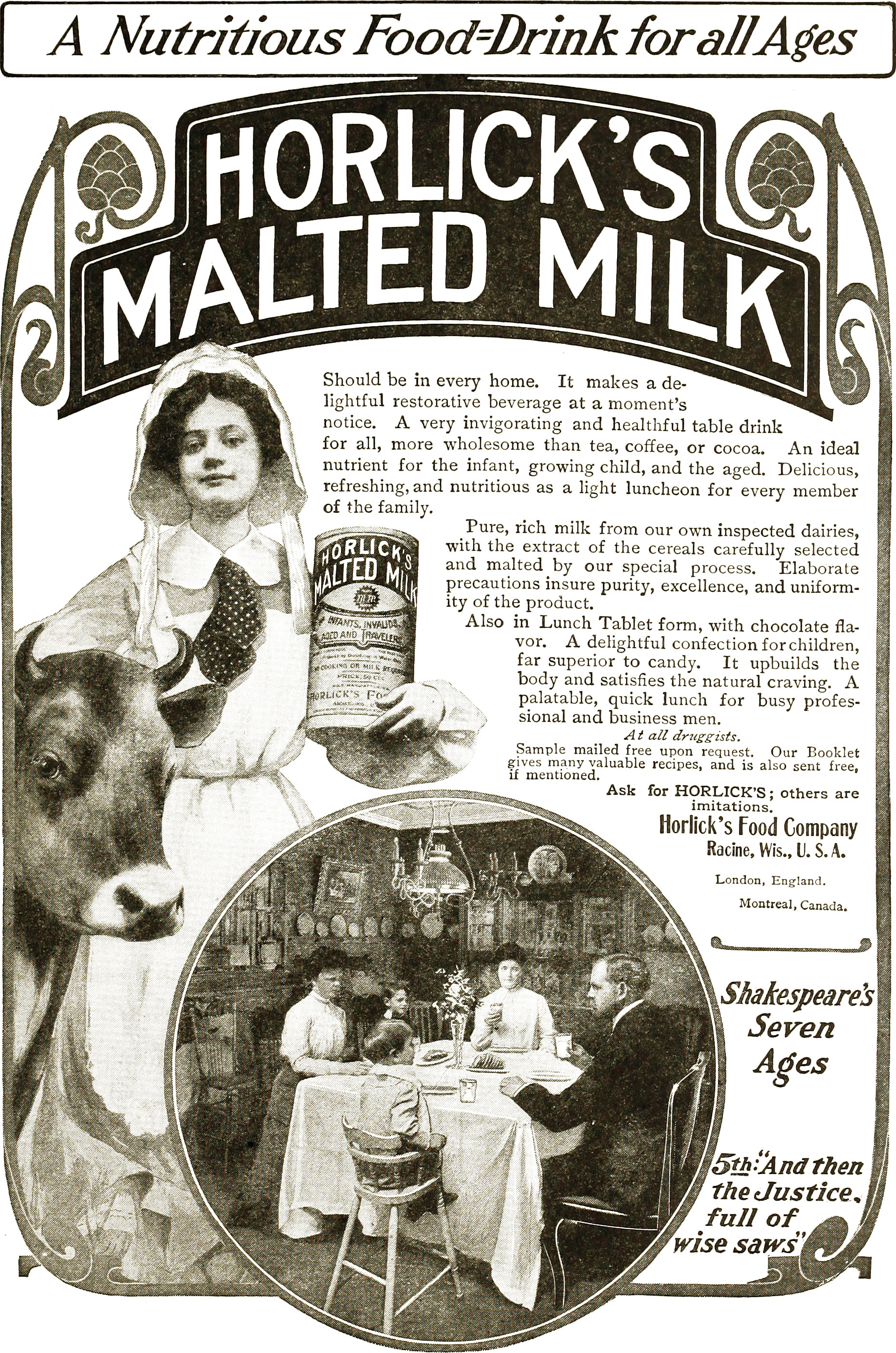
An advertisement for Horlicks from 1904.

In the United Kingdom, Horlicks is produced by Aimia Foods. It is available in original (prepared with hot milk), instant (prepared with hot water), chocolate (prepared with hot water), and vegan. A 'pudding range' is also available in cherry bakewell, banoffee pie and apple pie flavours. In addition, a 'nourishing shakes' range (requiring milk) includes products claiming to help with a healthy body, healthy gut, or healthy sleep.

GlaxoSmithKline attempted a rebrand of the product in 2004 for younger consumers by redesigning the packaging and publicising its consumption at a number of trendy London venues such as the Groucho Club.

The company also owned Horlicks Farms and Dairies, a cheese, dairy and cattle breeding station at "Hort Bridge", Ilminster, Somerset. (The cattle breeding centre provided an artificial insemination service to farmers). In 1958 it took over the Cheddar Valley Dairy, and by the early 1960s had retail rounds, depots, and shops at Burnham, Cheddar, Clevedon, Glastonbury, Nailsea, Taunton, and Weston-super-Mare.

== Company timeline ==
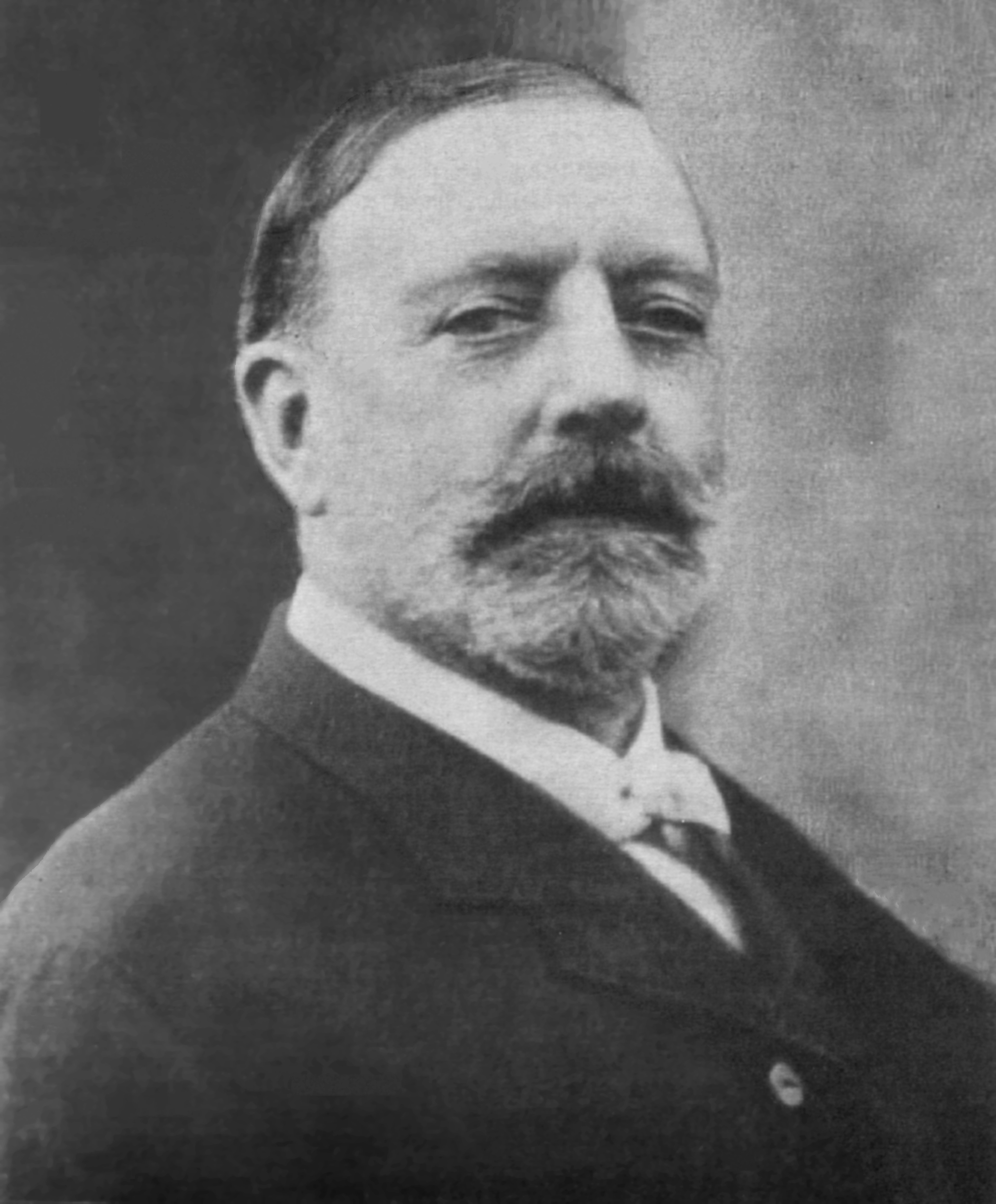
William Horlick

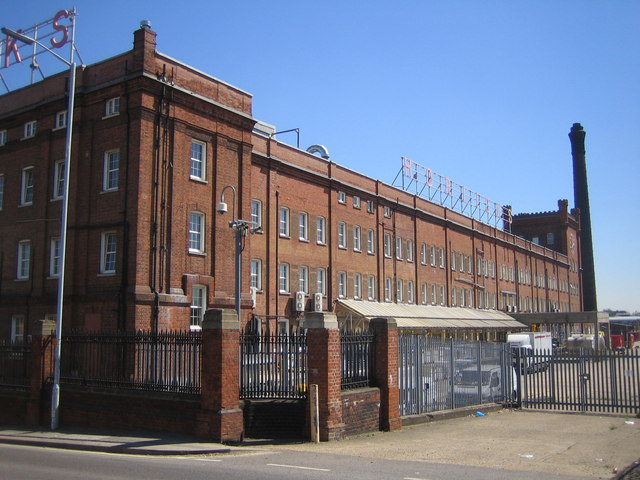
The Horlicks factory in Slough is a local landmark. This building has since been renovated and restored for residential use in the "Horlicks Quarter" housing development.

- 1869: William Horlick from Ruardean, Gloucestershire, emigrated to the United States.
- 1873: James Horlick, a pharmacist, joined his brother, William, in the US and together they founded the company J & W Horlicks in Chicago to manufacture a patented malted milk drink as an artificial infant food.
- 1875: Business moved to larger premises at Racine, Wisconsin, with an abundant supply of spring water.
- 1883: US patent 278,967 granted to William for first malted milk drink mixing powder with hot water.
- 1890: James returned to London to set up an office importing US-made product.
- 1906: Slough selected as site for new factory (see picture).
- 1908: Factory construction completed at a cost of £28,000.
- 1909–1910: Horlicks became popular as a provision for North Pole and South Pole expeditions by Robert Peary, Roald Amundsen, and Robert Falcon Scott.
- 1914: James made a baronet. World War I saw extensive use of Horlicks drink at home and at the front.
- 1921: Death of James led company to split, with William having responsibility for the Americas and the sons of James for the rest of the world.
- 1928: William Horlick High School founded just north of Horlicks' headquarters in Racine, Wisconsin.
- 1931: "Night Starvation" story developed to promote Horlicks as a bedtime drink.
- 1935: Richard E. Byrd named the Horlick Mountains on the edge of the Ross Ice Shelf after William, in appreciation of his support. A small factory opened in Australia for the local market, including New Zealand. Horlicks milky-chocolate-flavoured disks in paper packets, which were eaten as candy, were marketed in the USA via radio commercials touting the ease with which they could be taken to school by children.
  In the US, Horlicks Tablets were sold as a candy, offered in a glass bottle resembling an aspirin jar. In World War II the tablets were supplied to US, UK and other troops as an energy boosting treat, and included in lifeboat and liferaft rations, and aircrew escape kits. Today they are packaged in foil pouches, manufactured in Malaysia as Horlicks Malties.
- 1936: William Horlick died, aged 90.
- 1945: The US company was acquired by the UK Horlicks business.
- 1952: Horlicks was linked to the successful treatment of gastric ulcers and some forms of diabetes.
- 1960: Factory built in Punjab, India, to make Horlicks from buffalo milk.
- 1968: Factory built in West Punjab, to supply local demand (including present-day Bangladesh).
- 1969: Horlicks acquired by the Beecham Group.
- 1975–78: Factory construction and expansion in Rajahmundry, Andhra Pradesh.
- 1989: Beecham Group became SmithKline Beecham.
- 2000: SmithKline Beecham became GlaxoSmithKline.
- 2017: Horlicks in the UK acquired by Aimia Foods
- 2019: Horlicks outside of the UK acquired by Unilever

== See also ==
- List of hot beverages
- Malted milk
- Milo (drink)
- Ovaltine
- Panjiri
