= William Horlick =

American businessman (1846–1936)

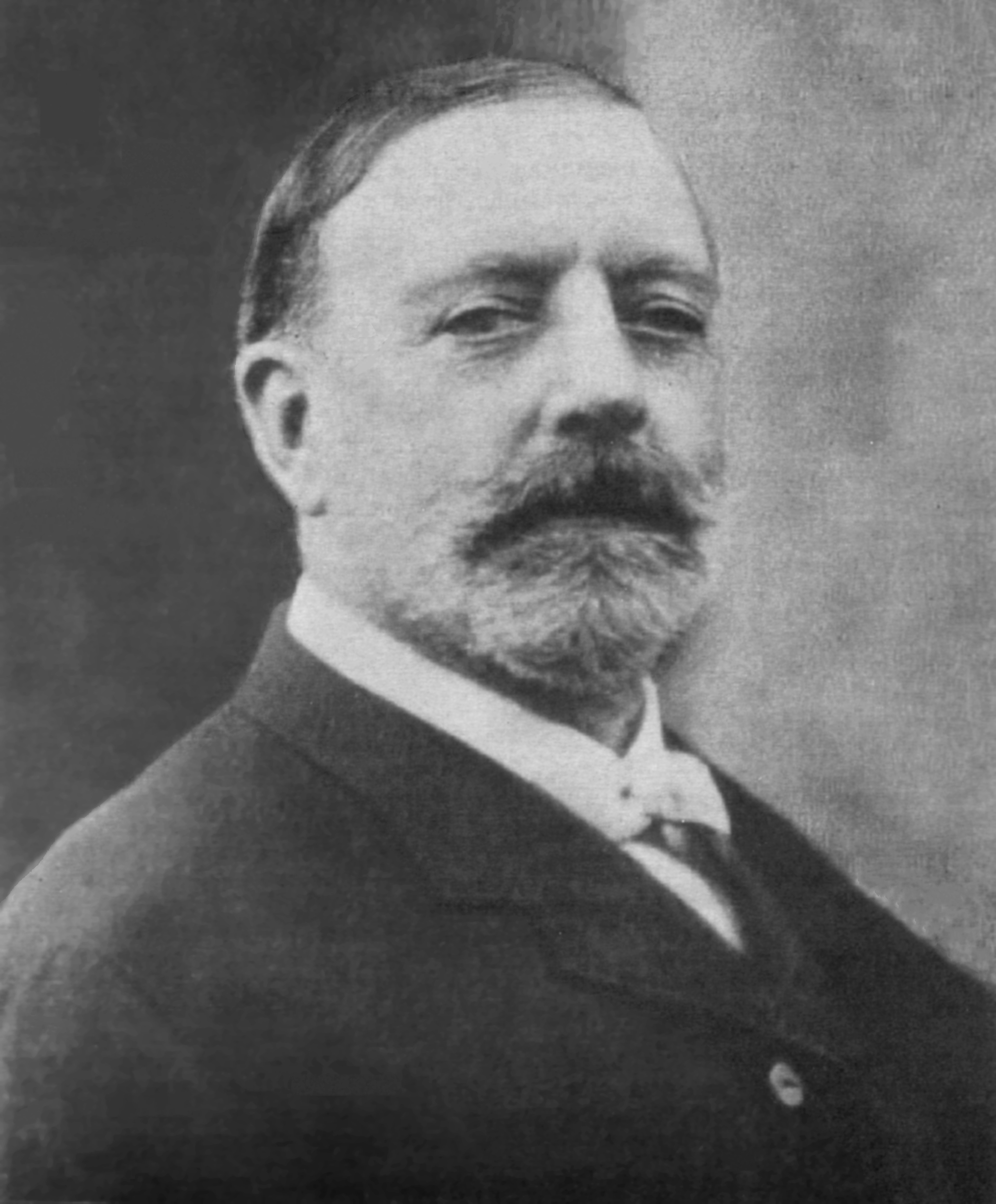
- Portrait of William Horlick
- Born: 23 February 1846; Ruardean, Gloucestershire, England
- Died: 25 September 1936 (aged 90); Racine, Wisconsin, U.S.
- Occupation: Food manufacturer
- Known for: Malted milk, Philanthropy
- Spouse: Arabella Horlick (1870–death)

William Horlick, Sr. (23 February 1846 – 25 September 1936) was an English food manufacturer and the original patent holder of malted milk. He emigrated to the United States in 1869, settling in Racine, Wisconsin. There he started a food company with his brother, James. Horlick was a well-known philanthropist in the Racine area. He was also a major sponsor of the Racine Legion, which played in the National Football League from 1922 until 1924. He died 25 September 1936 at the age of ninety.

== Biography ==
=== Early life and family ===
He was born in Ruardean, in the Forest of Dean, Gloucestershire, England, the youngest surviving child of James Horlick (1809–1878), a saddler, and his wife Priscilla Griffiths (1817–1874). He was sent to school in Hampshire with his brothers Peter (1842–1901) and James (1844–1921), before becoming apprenticed to a local saddler. At the same time, his brother James began working for the Mellin Food Company in London, which produced a powdered baby food from malt and bran. When at home in Ruardean, James, William and their father began experimenting with ways of making a granulated powder based on wheat and malted barley which could be stored for long periods in sealed containers.

=== Malted milk ===
After immigrating to the US in 1869, Horlick settled in Racine. In 1872, he moved to Chicago to begin a food manufacturing business with his brother, James. This was the genesis of the Horlick Food Company, which the two founded in 1873, and moved to Racine in 1876. At around the same time, William began working on creating a dried milk product. This work culminated with a US patent in 1883 and a product that was originally called "Diastoid," but was later trademarked as "malted milk" in 1887.

The company continued to expand, with new branches opening in New York City in 1889, and in England after James returned there in 1890. James Horlick was knighted in 1914, and raised to the baronetcy of Cowley Manor. New manufacturing plants were opened in Racine in 1902 and 1905. William served as the company's treasurer until his brother's death in 1921, at which time he became company president, holding that position until his death in 1936.

=== Philanthropy ===
Horlick was a prominent philanthropist, especially in the Racine area. Gifts in Racine include Memorial Hall, a maternity wing at St. Luke's Hospital (in memory of his daughter Alice), Island Park, and Horlick Athletic Field, and the land for the high school named in his honour (William Horlick High School).

Horlick also supported several polar expeditions, including one to the Antarctic by Richard Byrd and another to the North Pole by Roald Amundsen. Horlick not only supported the expeditions financially, but his malted milk also provided non-perishable nutrition for the explorers. Because of his contributions, Byrd named the Horlick Mountains in Antarctica after William Horlick.

=== Pro Football ===
In 1919, Horlick sponsored what was then called the "Horlick-Racine Legion". The team was sponsored by him and the American Legion Racine Post no. 76. Horlick paid the debts incurred for operating the Racine Legion. He also gave free use of his athletic field to both the Horlick-Racine Legion and Racine Tornadoes Football teams. He contributed substantial sums of money to convert Horlick Athletic Field to accommodate professional football and expended over $100,000 to cover the expenses of three 1920s seasons.

=== Roller Polo ===
Horlick owned a roller polo team in the Western League from 1900-1903. The team adopted the name "Horlicks of Racine" due to the equipment that he purchased for the club. The Horlicks finished their first season with a 7-6-5 record, a 15-8-3 mark in 1902, and a 34-46 record for the 1902/1903 season.

In 1903, he donated the Horlick Cup, a $300 silvery trophy that was presented to the winning team of the league. If a team captured it for three consecutive years, they would be able to keep it. It was won by Elwood in 1903 and then Richmond in 1904, but after the Western League folded before the conclusion of the 1905 season, it was sent back to Horlick. The league was revived two years later, but once again the loop shut down before the completion the season. The cup was sent back to Horlick once again. It's whereabouts after that remain unknown.

=== Personal life ===
He married his second cousin Arabella Horlick (1850–1938) in 1870, while in the US. They had four children: Alice Priscilla Horlick, Alexander J. Horlick, William Oliver Horlick Jr., and Maybelle Emma Horlick Sidley.
