= Sports in Wisconsin =

Wisconsin sports includes numerous professional and amateur sporting teams, events, and venues located in the U.S. state of Wisconsin.

== Professional teams ==
Wisconsin is represented by major league teams in the three most popular spectator sports in the United States: American football, baseball, and basketball. The Green Bay Packers have been part of the National Football League since the league's second season in 1921 and currently hold the record for the most NFL titles, earning the city of Green Bay the nickname "Titletown".

=== Major professional teams ===
Team	City	Founded	Sport	Current stadium	Current league	Championships
Green Bay Packers	Green Bay	1919	American football	Lambeau Field	National Football League	13: 1929, 1930, 1931, 1936, 1939, 1944, 1961, 1962, 1965, 1966 (I), 1967 (II), 1996 (XXXI), 2010 (XLV)
Milwaukee Bucks	Milwaukee	1968	Basketball	Fiserv Forum	National Basketball Association	2: 1971, 2021
Milwaukee Brewers	Milwaukee	1969	Baseball	American Family Field	Major League Baseball	1: 2026

=== Other professional teams ===
Team name	City	Founded	Sport	Current stadium	League	Championships
Beloit Sky Carp	Beloit	1982	Baseball	ABC Supply Stadium	Midwest League	1: 1995
Forward Madison FC	Madison	2018	Soccer	Breese Stevens Field	USL League One	0
Green Bay Blizzard	Green Bay	2003	Indoor football	Resch Center	Indoor Football League	0
LOVB Madison	Madison	2024	Volleyball	Wisconsin Field House Alliant Energy Center	LOVB Pro	0
Madison Radicals	Madison	2013	Ultimate frisbee	Breese Stevens Field	Ultimate Frisbee Association	1: 2018
Milwaukee Admirals	Milwaukee	1970	Ice hockey	UW–Milwaukee Panther Arena	American Hockey League	2: 1976, 2004
Milwaukee Milkmen	Franklin	2018	Baseball	Franklin Field	American Association of Professional Baseball	1: 2020
Milwaukee Wave	Milwaukee	1984	Indoor soccer	UW–Milwaukee Panther Arena	Major Arena Soccer League	7: 1998, 2000, 2001, 2005, 2011, 2012, 2019
Wisconsin Herd	Oshkosh	2017	Basketball	Oshkosh Arena	NBA G League	0
Wisconsin Timber Rattlers	Appleton	1958	Baseball	Fox Cities Stadium	Midwest League	10: 1960, 1964, 1966, 1967, 1969, 1978, 1982, 1983, 1984, 2012

== Former professional teams ==
Club	City	Years active	Sport	League	Championships	Fate
Milwaukee Braves	Milwaukee	1953–1965	Baseball	Major League Baseball	1: 1957	Moved to Atlanta and are now the Atlanta Braves
Milwaukee Brewers	Milwaukee	1894–1901	Baseball	Western League		Moved to St. Louis, Missouri, and became the St. Louis Browns; currently the Baltimore Orioles
Milwaukee Grays	Milwaukee	1877–1878	Baseball	National League		Defunct
Milwaukee Hawks	Milwaukee	1951–1955	Basketball	National Basketball Association		Moved to St. Louis, Missouri, and became the St. Louis Hawks; currently the Atlanta Hawks
Madison Hatters	Madison	1994	Baseball	Midwest League		Moved to Midland, Michigan, and are now the Great Lakes Loons
Madison Muskies	Madison	1982–1993	Baseball	Midwest League		Moved to Comstock Park, Michigan, and are now the West Michigan Whitecaps
Wausau Mets/Timbers	Wausau	1975–1990	Baseball	Midwest League	1: 1981	Moved to Geneva, Illinois, and are now the Kane County Cougars
Wisconsin Rapids Senators/Twins	Wisconsin Rapids/ Kenosha	1963–1983	Baseball	Midwest League	1: 1973	Moved to Fort Wayne, Indiana, and are now the Fort Wayne TinCaps
Duluth–Superior Dukes	Superior-Duluth	1993–2002	Baseball	Northern League	1: 1997	Split time with Duluth, Minnesota; moved to Kansas City, Kansas, and are now the Kansas City Monarchs
Madison Black Wolf	Madison	1996–2000	Baseball	Northern League		Moved to Lincoln, Nebraska, and are now the Lincoln Saltdogs
Kenosha Mammoths	Kenosha	2003–2004	Baseball	Frontier League		Moved to Ozark, Missouri, and became the Springfield-Ozark Ducks
Milwaukee Brewers	Milwaukee	1902–1952	Baseball	American Association	8: 1913, 1914, 1936, 1943, 1944, 1945, 1951, 1952	Moved to Toledo, Ohio, and became the Toledo Sox
Madison Kodiaks	Madison	1999–2000	Ice hockey	United Hockey League		Moved to Kalamazoo, Michigan, and are now the Kalamazoo Wings
Milwaukee Wave United	Milwaukee	2003–2004	Soccer	A-League		Defunct
Beloit Fairies	Beloit		Football	National Football League		Defunct
Kenosha Maroons	Kenosha	1924	Football	National Football League		Defunct
Milwaukee Badgers	Milwaukee	1922–1926	Football	National Football League		Defunct
Racine Legion/Tornadoes	Racine	1915–1926	Football	National Football League		Defunct
Milwaukee Chiefs	Milwaukee	1940–1941	Football	American Football League		Defunct
Sheboygan Redskins	Sheboygan	1933–1951	Basketball	National Basketball Association	1: 1943	Defunct
Milwaukee Mustangs	Milwaukee	1994–2001	Arena football	Arena Football League		Defunct
Milwaukee Mustangs	Milwaukee	2009–2012	Arena football	Arena Football League		Defunct
La Crosse Night Train/ Wisconsin Locomotives	La Crosse		Indoor football	National Indoor Football League		Defunct
La Crosse Spartans	La Crosse	2009–2011	Indoor football	Indoor Football League		Defunct
Kenosha Comets	Kenosha	1943–1951	Baseball	All-American Girls Professional Baseball League		Defunct
Racine Belles	Racine	1943–1950	Baseball	All-American Girls Professional Baseball League	2: 1943, 1946	Moved to Battle Creek, Michigan, and became the Battle Creek Belles
Milwaukee Chicks	Milwaukee	1944	Baseball	All-American Girls Professional Baseball League	1944	Moved to Grand Rapids, Michigan, and became the Grand Rapids Chicks
Milwaukee Bears	Milwaukee	1923	Baseball	Negro National League		Defunct
Milwaukee Brewers	Milwaukee	1884	Baseball	Union Association		Defunct
Milwaukee Brewers	Milwaukee	1886–1892	Baseball	American Association		
Oshkosh All-Stars	Oshkosh	1929–1949	Basketball	National Basketball League	2: 1941, 1942	Defunct
Green Bay Bombers	Green Bay	1997–2000	Football	Indoor Football League	1: 1999	Defunct
Madison Mad Dogs	Madison	1998–2000	Football	Indoor Football League		Defunct
La Crosse River Rats	La Crosse	2000	Football	Indoor Football League		Defunct
La Crosse Catbirds	La Crosse	1983–1994	Basketball	Continental Basketball Association	2: 1990, 1992	Moved to Pittsburgh, Pennsylvania, and became the Pittsburgh Piranhas
La Crosse Bobcats	La Crosse	1996–2001	Basketball	Continental Basketball Association		Defunct
Wisconsin Flyers	Oshkosh	1982–1987	Basketball	Continental Basketball Association		Moved to Rochester, Minnesota, and became the Rochester Flyers
Eau Claire Cardinals/ Bears/Braves	Eau Claire	1933–1942, 1946–1962	Baseball	Northern League	3: 1936, 1941, 1962	Defunct
Superior Blues	Superior	1933–1942, 1946–1955	Baseball	Northern League	2: 1933, 1952	Defunct
Wausau Lumberjacks	Wausau	1905-1914, 1936-1942, 1946-1953, 1956-1957	Baseball	Northern League	1: 1941	Defunct
Duluth–Superior Dukes	Superior-Duluth	1956–1970	Baseball	Northern League	2: 1969, 1970	Split time with Duluth, Minnesota; defunct
Green Bay Sultans	Green Bay	1996	Baseball	Prairie League		Defunct
Green Bay Dodgers	Green Bay	1891–1892, 1902, 1905–1914, 1940–1942, 1946–1953, 1958–1960	Baseball	Illinois–Indiana–Iowa League	3: 1946, 1953, 1959	Defunct
Madison Blues	Madison	1923–1942	Baseball	Illinois–Indiana–Iowa League		Defunct
Sheboygan Indians	Sheboygan	1923–1932, 1934–1937, 1940–1942, 1946–1953	Baseball	Wisconsin State League	10: 1923, 1926, 1927, 1931, 1937, 1942, 1947, 1948, 1951, 1952	Defunct
Appleton Papermakers	Appleton	1909–1914, 1940–1942, 1946–1953	Baseball	Wisconsin State League	1: 1910	Defunct
Beloit Collegians	Beloit	1905	Baseball	Wisconsin State League		Defunct
Eau Claire Commissioners	Eau Claire	1886–1887, 1906–1907, 1909–1912	Baseball	Minnesota–Wisconsin League		Defunct
Fond du Lac Mudhens	Fond du Lac	1891, 1902, 1907–1911	Baseball	Wisconsin-Illinois League		Defunct
Janesville Cubs	Janesville	1941–1942, 1946–1953	Baseball	Wisconsin State League		Defunct
La Crosse Blackhawks	La Crosse	1905–1913, 1917, 1926, 1940–1942	Baseball	Wisconsin State League	1: 1940	Defunct
La Crosse Pinks	La Crosse	1905–1912	Baseball	Wisconsin State League	2: 1905, 1906	Defunct
Oshkosh Giants	Oshkosh	1886–1887, 1891–1892, 1902, 1905–1914, 1941–1942, 1946–1953	Baseball	Wisconsin State League	2: 1949, 1950	Defunct
Wisconsin Rapids White Sox	Wisconsin Rapids	1940–1942, 1946–1953	Baseball	Wisconsin State League		Defunct
Madison Senators	Madison	1907–1914	Baseball	Wisconsin–Illinois League		Defunct
Oshkosh Indians	Oshkosh	1886–1887, 1891–1892, 1902, 1905–1914	Baseball	Wisconsin–Illinois League		Defunct
Marinette-Menominee Twins	Marinette-Menominee	1891–1892, 1914	Baseball	Wisconsin–Illinois League	1: 1891	Split time with Menominee, Michigan; defunct
Milwaukee Creams	Milwaukee	1889, 1902–1903, 1913	Baseball	Wisconsin–Illinois League	1: 1903	
Racine Malted Milks	Racine	1909–1914	Baseball	Wisconsin–Illinois League		Defunct
Kenosha Northern Ice	Kenosha		Football	Women's Professional Football League		Defunct
Kenosha Riveters	Kenosha		Football	Women's Professional Football League	2003	Defunct
Madison Monsters	Madison	1995–199	Ice hockey	United Hockey League		Moved to Knoxville, Tennessee, and became the Knoxville Speed
Wisconsin Blast	Appleton	1997–1999	Basketball	International Basketball League		Defunct
Milwaukee Bombers	Milwaukee	1998–2018	Australian rules football	United States Australian Football League	2: 2006 (men), 2009 (women)	Ceased professional operations
Milwaukee Does	Milwaukee	1978–1980	Basketball	Women's Professional Basketball League		Defunct
Milwaukee Clarks	Milwaukee	1948–1950	Ice hockey	Eastern Hockey League; International Hockey League		Defunct
Milwaukee Chiefs	Milwaukee	1952–1954	Ice hockey	International Hockey League		Defunct
Milwaukee Falcons	Milwaukee	1959–1961	Ice hockey	International Hockey League		Defunct
Milwaukee Sea Gulls	Milwaukee	1950–1951	Ice hockey	United States Hockey League		Defunct
Milwaukee Wings	Milwaukee	1972–1973	Ice hockey	Continental Hockey League		Defunct
Madison Blues	Madison	1973–1977	Ice hockey	Continental Hockey League		Defunct
Kenosha Flyers	Kenosha	1974–1975, 1976–1981	Ice hockey	Continental Hockey League	1: 1975	Defunct
Janesville Jets	Janesville	1981–1982	Ice hockey	Continental Hockey League		Defunct
Green Bay Ice	Green Bay	1992–1993	Ice hockey	American Hockey Association		Defunct
Milwaukee Rampage	Milwaukee	1993–2002	Soccer	USL A-League	2: 1997, 2002	Defunct
Milwaukee Wave United	Milwaukee	2003–2004	Soccer	USL A-League		Defunct
Wisconsin Rebels	Menasha	1998–2004	Soccer	Premier Development League		Defunct
Milwaukee Schlitz	Milwaukee	1977–1982	Softball	Professional Slow Pitch Softball League	3: 1979, 1980, 1982	Defunct
Milwaukee Blue Waves	Milwaukee	1980	Inline hockey	Roller Hockey International		Defunct
Milwaukee Bonecrushers	Milwaukee	2008–2009	Football	Continental Indoor Football League		Moved to Villa Park, Illinois, and became the Chicago Cardinals
Wisconsin Dragons	Milwaukee	2011–2012, 2018–2019	Football	Women's Football Alliance		Defunct
Wisconsin Glo	Oshkosh	2019–2023	Basketball	Global Women's Basketball Association	3: 2019, 2021, 2023	Moved to semi-professional level
Wisconsin Wolfpack	Madison	2009–2010	Football	Continental Indoor Football League		
Wisconsin Woflpack	Waukesha	2008–2011	Football	Mid Continental Football League		
Wisconsin Warriors	Kenosha	2008–2015	Football	Independent Women's Football League	1: 2009	
Wisconsin Wolves	Madison	2006–2012	Football	Women's Football Alliance		

== Notable semi-professional and amateur leagues ==
Club	Sport	League	Championships
Eau Claire Express	Baseball	Northwoods League	2010
Fond du Lac Dock Spiders	Baseball	Northwoods League	2018
Lakeshore Chinooks	Baseball	Northwoods League	2014
Green Bay Rockers	Baseball	Northwoods League	
Kenosha Kingfish	Baseball	Northwoods League	2015
La Crosse Loggers	Baseball	Northwoods League	2012
Madison Mallards	Baseball	Northwoods League	2004, 2013
Wausau Woodchucks	Baseball	Northwoods League	2001, 2003
Wisconsin Rapids Rafters	Baseball	Northwoods League	2016
Racine Raiders	Football	North American Football League	1954, 1956, 1964, 1965, 1981, 1984, 1987, 1988, 1989, 1992, 1993, 1994, 1995, 1999, 2001, 2006
Green Bay Gamblers	Ice hockey	United States Hockey League	1963, 1973, 1996, 1997, 2000
Madison Capitols	Ice hockey	United States Hockey League	
Janesville Jets	Ice hockey	North American Hockey League	
Central Wisconsin Saints	Ice hockey	Great Lakes Hockey League	
Eagle River Falcons	Ice hockey	Great Lakes Junior Hockey League	
Fond du Lac Bears	Ice hockey	Great Lakes Hockey League	
Fox Cities Ice Dogs	Ice hockey	Great Lakes Hockey League	
Green Bay Deacons	Ice hockey	Great Lakes Hockey League	2009
Madison Blues	Ice hockey	Great Lakes Hockey League	
Mosinee Papermakers	Ice hockey	Great Lakes Hockey League	
West Bend Bombers	Ice hockey	Great Lakes Hockey League	
Eau Claire Aris FC	Soccer	National Premier Soccer League	
Green Bay Voyageurs FC	Soccer	USL League Two	
Milwaukee Bavarians	Soccer	National Premier Soccer League	2
Madison 56ers	Soccer	National Premier Soccer League	
Superior City FC	Soccer	United Premier Soccer League	

== Motor racing venues ==
Two world championships are held in Wisconsin. The World Championship Snowmobile Derby is held at Eagle River, Wisconsin. The world championship off-road racing event is held at Crandon International Off-Road Raceway.

The Milwaukee Mile, an oval track opened in 1903, is the oldest operating motorsports venue in the world, having hosted the IndyCar Series and NASCAR Xfinity Series. Road America, a road course opened in 1955, currently hosts the IndyCar Series, NASCAR Xfinity Series, IMSA WeatherTech SportsCar Championship and SCCA Pirelli World Challenge.

Track	Location
Milwaukee Mile	West Allis
Madison International Speedway	Oregon
Dells Raceway Park	Wisconsin Dells
Road America	Elkhart Lake
Wisconsin International Raceway	Kaukauna
Crandon International Off-Road Raceway	Crandon
Great Lakes Dragaway	Union Grove
Slinger Super Speedway	Slinger
Angell Park Speedway	Sun Prairie
Cedar Lake Speedway	New Richmond
La Crosse Fairgrounds Speedway	West Salem
State Park Speedway	Wausau
Golden Sands Speedway	Wisconsin Rapids
Shawano Speedway	Shawano
Oshkosh Speedzone Raceway	Oshkosh
Gravity Park USA	Chilton
Central Wisconsin Raceway	Unity
Langlade County Speedway	Antigo
ABC Raceway	Ashland
Beaver Dam Raceway	Beaver Dam
Dodge County Fairgrounds	Beaver Dam
Eagle River Speedway	Eagle River
Rock Falls Raceway	Eau Claire
Mississippi Thunder Speedway	Fountain City
Jefferson Speedway	Cambridge
Luxemburg Tri-Star Speedway	Luxemburg
Manitowoc County Expo Speedway	Manitowoc
Marshfield Motor Speedway	Marshfield
Red Cedar Speedway	Menomonie
Plymouth Dirt Track	Plymouth
Rice Lake Speedway	Rice Lake
Outagamie Speedway	Seymour
Thunderhill Speedway	Sturgeon Bay
Superior Speedway	Superior
TNT Speedway	Three Lakes
Excalibur Speedway	Tomah
Tomahawk Speedway	Tomahawk
Wilmot Raceway	Wilmot
Badger Raceway	Dousman
Eau Claire Raceway	Eau Claire
Flying Pines Kart Raceway	Balsam Lake
GSR Kartway	Clintonville
Highway 13 Raceway	South Range
Hi-Go Raceway	Cecil
Meadowview Kartway	Hilbert
Sugar River Raceway	Brodhead
Thunderhill Speedway	Downsville
USA International Raceway	Shawano
Coulee Go-Kart Raceway	West Salem
141 Speedway	Maribel
Eagle Valley Speedway	Jim Falls
Grant County Speedway	Lancaster
Kopellah Speedway	St. Croix Falls
Lafayette County Speedway	Darlington
Chilton Speedway	Chilton

=== Former venues ===
Track	Location
Lake Geneva Raceway	Lake Geneva
Janesville Airport	Janesville
Griffith Park	Wisconsin Rapids
Cedarburg Fireman's Park	Cedarburg
Columbus 151 Speedway	Columbus
Hales Corners Speedway	Franklin
Ideal Race Track	Pleasant Prairie
Elkhart Lake Street Course	Elkhart Lake
Lynndale Farms Road Racing Course	Pewaukee
Central Wisconsin Speedway	Colby

== Notable golf clubs and courses ==
Course	Location
Whistling Straits	Haven
Brown Deer Park Golf Course	Milwaukee
Erin Hills	Erin
Blue Mound Golf & Country Club	Wauwatosa
Geneva National Golf Club	Lake Geneva
Blackwolf Run	Kohler
Janesville Country Club	Janesville
Big Fish Golf Club	Hayward
Eagle Springs Golf Resort	Eagle
Green Bay Country Club	Bellevue
Milwaukee Country Club	River Hills
University Ridge Golf Course	Verona

== See also ==
- Sports in Milwaukee
- Wisconsin Athletic Walk of Fame
