= Marinette, Wisconsin minor league baseball history =

Marinette, Wisconsin minor league baseball teams
- 1891–1914; (1891–1892, 1914); Marinette, Wisconsin

Minor league affiliations
- Class: Independent (1891–1892); Class C (1914)
- League: Wisconsin State League (1891); Wisconsin-Michigan League (1892); Wisconsin-Illinois League (1914)

Major league affiliations
- Team: None

Minor league titles
- League titles (1): 1891

Team data
- Name: Marinette Badgers (1891–1892); Menominee Wolverines (1892); Marinette–Menominee Twins (1914)
- Ballpark: Fairgrounds Driving Park (1892, 1914)

Minor league baseball teams were based in Marinette, Wisconsin in various seasons between 1891 and 1914. Marinette partnered with neighboring Menominee, Michigan, playing as the Marinette–Menominee Twins in 1914. Marinette played in the 1891 Wisconsin State League. Marinette and Menominee, Michigan based teams played as members of the Wisconsin-Michigan League in 1892 and Wisconsin-Illinois League in 1914.

Baseball Hall of Fame member Hank O'Day played for the 1892 Marinette Badgers.

Marinette teams hosted minor league home games at the Fairgrounds Driving Park.

== History ==
It was reported that a Marinette first fielded a minor league team in 1891. The Marinette Badgers became charter members of the Wisconsin State League. Marinette played in 1891 with the Appleton Papermakers, Fond du Lac Mudhens, Green Bay Dock Wallopers, Oconto Log Drivers and Oshkosh Indians teams joining Marinette in the six–team Wisconsin State League.

The Marinette use of the "Badger" moniker corresponds to state history and folklore. The Badger is the mascot of the University of Wisconsin. The state of Wisconsin is known as the "Badger State" and the badger is the official state mammal of Wisconsin. Reportedly, early miners in Wisconsin were known to dig tunnels into hillsides, in which they also slept during winter months, leading to the nickname.

Marinette won the 1891 Wisconsin State League championship. Playing under manager Jake Aydelotte, the Badgers placed first in the league standings with a record of 51–39. Marinette finished 2.5 games ahead of the second place Appleton Papermakers in the final standings.

Neighboring Menominee, Michigan began minor league play in 1892. The Marinette Badgers continued play as charter members of the Michigan-Wisconsin League, playing along with the Menominee Wolverines. The league formed and played in the 1892 season as a non–signatory, Independent level league. The Green Bay Bays, Ishpeming-Negaunee Unions, Marquette Undertakers and Oshkosh Indians joined the Marinette and Menominee teams as charter members.

In 1892, the Marinette Badgers placed third in the Michigan-Wisconsin League final standings. Marinette finished with a record of 45–44, playing under managers Joe Cantillon, Mike Morrison and Jim Donahue. After the season began on May 37, 1892, the Green Bay Bays won the 1892 Michigan-Wisconsin League with a 48–39 overall record in the six–team league, finishing 4.0 games ahead of Marinette. The final records were led by Green Bay, followed by the Menominee Wolverines (44–40 under manager William Lucas). Marinette Badgers (45–44) and Oshkosh Indians (41–50). The Marquette Undertakers (20–29) and Ishpeming-Negaunee Unions (24–20) teams folded during the season.

During the season, it was reported that Green Bay president Frank W. Murphy, who also served as president of the league, supplemented his roster with players obtained from the Terre Haute Hottentots and other teams en route to winning the championship. New manager Sam LaRocque had earlier played with Terre Haute in 1892. The Michigan-Wisconsin League permanently folded following the 1892 season.

In 1914, minor league baseball returned. The Marinette–Menominee Twins resumed play as members of the eight–team Class C level Wisconsin-Illinois League, replacing the Fond du Lac Molls franchise in league play. Marinette partnered with neighboring Menominee, Michigan for establishing the franchise. The Marinette-Menominee Twins joined the Appleton Papermakers, Green Bay Bays, Madison Senators, Oshkosh Indians, Racine Belles, Rockford Wolves and Wausau Lumberjacks in league play.

The Marinette–Menominee Twins finished the 1914 Wisconsin-Illinois League season with an overall record of 61–59 to place fifth in the final standings. Managed by John Wickenhoefer and Jack Sheehan, Marinette–Menominee finished 15.0 games behind the first place Oshkosh Indians in the final Wisconsin-Illinois League standings. The Wisconsin-Illinois League permanently folded after completing the 1914 season.

Marinette, Wisconsin and Menominee, Michigan have not hosted another minor league team.

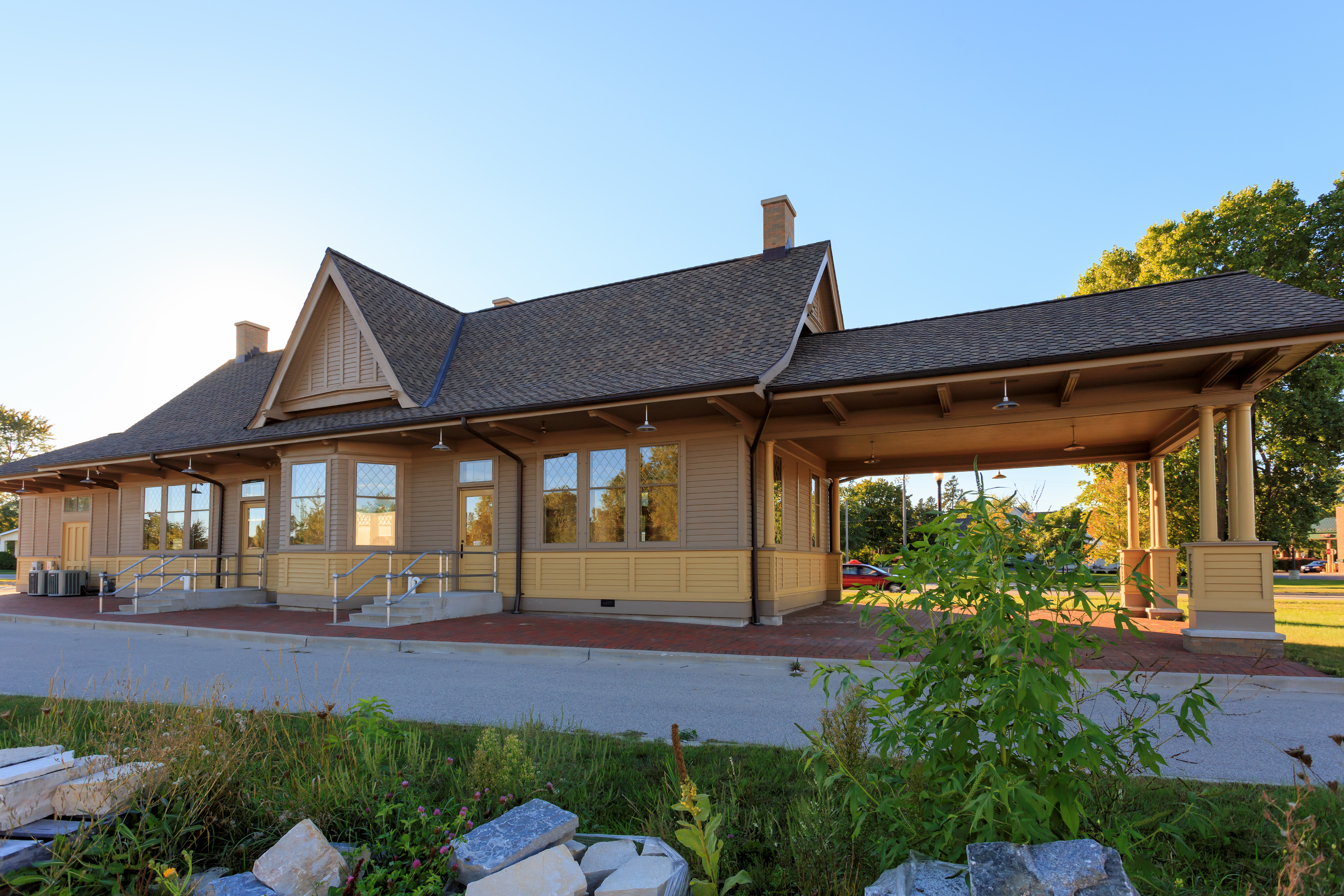
(2013) Milwaukee Road Depot. National Register of Historic Places. Marinette, Wisconsin

== The ballpark ==
The Marinette-based minor league teams were noted to have played home games at the Fairgrounds Driving Park. It was noted the ballpark had a capacity of 1,400, with a grandstand was built for racing. The location was at Broadway & Park Streets, which are today 13th Street & 18th Street in Marinette, Wisconsin. The site today is home to an Emerson electric plant.

== Timeline ==
| Year(s) | # Yrs. | Team | Level | League | Ballpark |
|---|---|---|---|---|---|
| 1891 | 1 | Marinette Badgers | Independent | Wisconsin State League | Fairgrounds Driving Park |
| 1892 (1) | 1 | Marinette Badgers | Independent | Wisconsin-Michigan League | Fairgrounds Driving Park |
| 1892 (2) | 1 | Menominee Wolverines | Independent | Wisconsin-Michigan League | Fairgrounds Driving Park |
| 1914 | 1 | Marinette-Menominee Twins | Class D | Wisconsin-Illinois League | Fairgrounds Driving Park |

== Year-by-year records ==
| Year | Record | Finish | Manager | Playoffs/notes |
|---|---|---|---|---|
| 1891 | 51–39 | 3rd | Jake Adeylott | League champions No playoffs held |
| 1892 (1) | 45–44 | 3rd | Joe Cantillon; Mike Morrison / Jim Donahue | Marniette; No playoffs held |
| 1892 (2) | 44–40 | 2nd | William Lucas | Menominee; No playoffs held |
| 1914 | 61–59 | 5th | John Wickenhoefer / Jack Sheehan | No playoffs held |

== Notable alumni ==
- Charlie Abbey (1892)
- Charlie Bartson (1892)
- Grant Briggs (1891)
- Harry Burrell (1892)
- Joe Cantillon (1892, MGR)
- Jim Donahue (1892, MGR)
- George Flynn (1892)
- Bill Hoffer (1892)
- Tom Letcher (1891)
- Harry Mace (1892)
- Bill McClellan (1892)
- Gus McGinnis (1891)
- Mart McQuaid (1892)
- Mox McQuery (1892)
- Mike Morrison (1892, MGR)
- Tom Morrissey (1892)
- George Nicol (1891)
- Harley Payne (1891-1892)
- John Reccius (1892)
- Nick Reeder (1891)
- Josh Reilly (1892)
- Jack Sheehan (1914, MGR)
- Earl Smith (1914)
- Ben Stephens (1892)
- Bill Van Dyke (1892)
- Joe Walsh (1892)
- Jack Wentz (1891)

== See also ==
- Marinette Badgers players
- Marinette (minor league baseball) players
- Marinette-Menominee Twins players
- Menominee (minor league baseball) players
