= Green Bay Bays =

- 1892–1914; (1891–1892, 1902, 1905–1914); Green Bay, Wisconsin

Minor league affiliations
- Class: Independent (1891–1892, 1902); Class D (1905–1909); Class C (1910–1914)
- League: Wisconsin State League (1891); Wisconsin-Michigan League (1892); Wisconsin State League (1902, 1905–1907); Wisconsin-Illinois League (1909–1914)

Major league affiliations
- Team: None

Minor league titles
- League titles (1): 1892

Team data
- Name: Green Bay Dock Wallopers (1891); Green Bay Bays (1892, 1902); Green Bay Colts (1905–1906); Green Bay Orphans (1907); Green Bay Tigers (1908); Green Bay Bays (1909–1914)
- Ballpark: Hagemeister Park (1891–1892); Bellevue Park (1902, 1905–1914)

The Green Bay Bays were a minor league baseball team based in Green Bay, Wisconsin, playing between 1891 and 1914.

Green Bay began minor league play as members of the 1891 Wisconsin State League, followed by play in the 1892 Wisconsin-Michigan League and Wisconsin State League between 1902 and 1908. After the Wisconsin State League changed names, the Green Bay Bays continued play from 1909 to 1914 in the Class C level Wisconsin-Illinois League. The Green Bay Bays ceased play when the Wisconsin-Illinois League permanently folded following the 1914 season. The Green Bay Bays were succeeded in minor league play by the 1941 Green Bay Bluejays, who began a tenure of play in the Wisconsin State League.

Besides the "Bays" nickname, Green Bay teams played as the "Dock Wallopers" (1891), "Colts" (1905–1906), "Orphans" (1907) and "Tigers" (1908).

The Green Bay teams hosted minor league home games at Hagemeister Park in 1891 and 1892 and at Bellevue Park through 1914. Both sites later became home to the Green Bay Packers of the National Football League.

== History ==
=== 1891: First minor league season / Wisconsin State League ===
In 1891, Green Bay began minor league play when the Green Bay "Dock Wallopers" were formed and became charter members of the independent Wisconsin State League. The Appleton Papermakers, Fond du Lac Mudhens, Marinette Lumber Shovers, Oconto Log Drivers and Oshkosh Indians teams joined with Green Bay in the six–team Wisconsin State League.

Green Bay played their first minor league game on May 23, 1891, at their home ballpark, Hagemeister Park. Appleton defeated Green Bay 4–0 in the home opener at Green Bay, with 400 to 500 fans in attendance.

In their first season of play, Green Bay finished in fourth place in the 1891 Wisconsin State League standings. Playing the season under managers Thomas Murray and George Brackett, the Dock Wallopers ended the season with a record of 48–42. Marinette won the championship and finished 2½ games ahead of the second place Appleton Papermakers and 3.0 games ahead of fourth place Green Bay in the final standings.

The Wisconsin State League did not return to play in 1892 and Green Bay joined a new league.

=== 1892: Wisconsin–Michigan League champions ===
In 1892, the Green Bay "Bays" nickname first appeared as the team continued play, becoming charter members of the six-team Wisconsin–Michigan League. The league formed for the 1892 season as a non–signatory, Independent level league. The Ishpeming-Negaunee Unions, Marinette Badgers, Marquette Undertakers, Menominee Wolverines and Oshkosh Indians teams joined Green Bay as Wisconsin–Michigan League charter members.

The 1892 Green Bay Bays won the Wisconsin–Michigan League championship after the league lost two teams during the season. The Bays were led to the championship by manager Sam LaRocque. After the season began on May 37, 1892, the Green Bay Bays won the 1892 Wisconsin–Michigan League. The Bays ended the season with a 48–39 record in the six–team league, finishing 6.0 games ahead of the Oshkosh Indians. Green Bay was followed by the Menominee Wolverines (44–40), Marinette Badgers (45–44) and Oshkosh in the final standings. The Marquette Undertakers (20–29) and Ishpeming-Negaunee Unions (24–20) teams folded during the season. Green Bay pitcher Robert Gayle led the league with 14 wins.

Green Bay team president Frank W. Murphy also served the dual role as president of the league. Murphy created controversy in winning the championship after it was reported that Murphy had secretly upgraded the Green Bay roster before and during the season with a new manager and players, as well as new uniforms and equipment. Numerous Green Bay players were obtained from the Terre Haute Hottentots leading to the championship. All the former Green Bay players were released.

The Wisconsin–Michigan League permanently folded following the 1892 season.

=== 1905 to 1907: Green Bay Colts / Wisconsin State League ===
After a decade without a minor league team, Green Bay returned to play in 1902 joining the reformed Wisconsin State League. Green Bay was managed by Schwartz and Schuette. The league reformed as an eight-team independent league. Final standings and records for the 1902 league season are unknown, The Wisconsin State League did not play as a minor league in 1903.

In 1905, the Wisconsin State League reformed, and Green Bay joined the league, as the Green Bay "Colts" resumed minor league baseball play as members of six–team Class D level Wisconsin State League, also called the "Wisconsin Association," with all league teams based in Wisconsin. The Colts joined the Beloit Collegians, Freeport Pretzels, La Crosse Pinks, Oshkosh Indians and Wausau Lumberjacks teams in league play.

The 1905 Green Bay Colts ended their first season of Wisconsin State League play in last place. With a record of 47–62, the Colts placed sixth in the six-team Wisconsin State League standings, finishing 21.0 games behind the champion La Crosse Pinks. Green Bay had five managers during their last place season: Wiliam Kennelly, William McGinnis, Mart McQuaid, Ernest Van Erman and Warren Beck. The league held no playoffs, with the regular season first place team winning the championship.

In their second season of minor league play, the 1906 Green Bay Colts continued as members of the six-team Wisconsin State League. The Colts ended the 1906 season with a 55–63 record, placing fourth in the league standings, playing the season under managers George Bubser and Phil Stremmel. The Colts finished 21.0 games behind the first place La Crosse Pinks in the final standings.

The Green Bay "Orphans" continued play as the 1907 Wisconsin State League expanded to eight teams, adding the Madison Senators and Fond du Lac Webfoots as expansion franchises. The league remained classified as a Class D level league.

The "Orphans" ended the 1907 Wisconsin State League regular season in seventh place. With a record of 48–78, playing the season under managers Ira Hastings and John Corrigan, Green Bay ended the season 31½ games behind the first place Freeport Pretzels in the eight–team league.

=== 1908 to 1914: Wisconsin-Illinois League ===
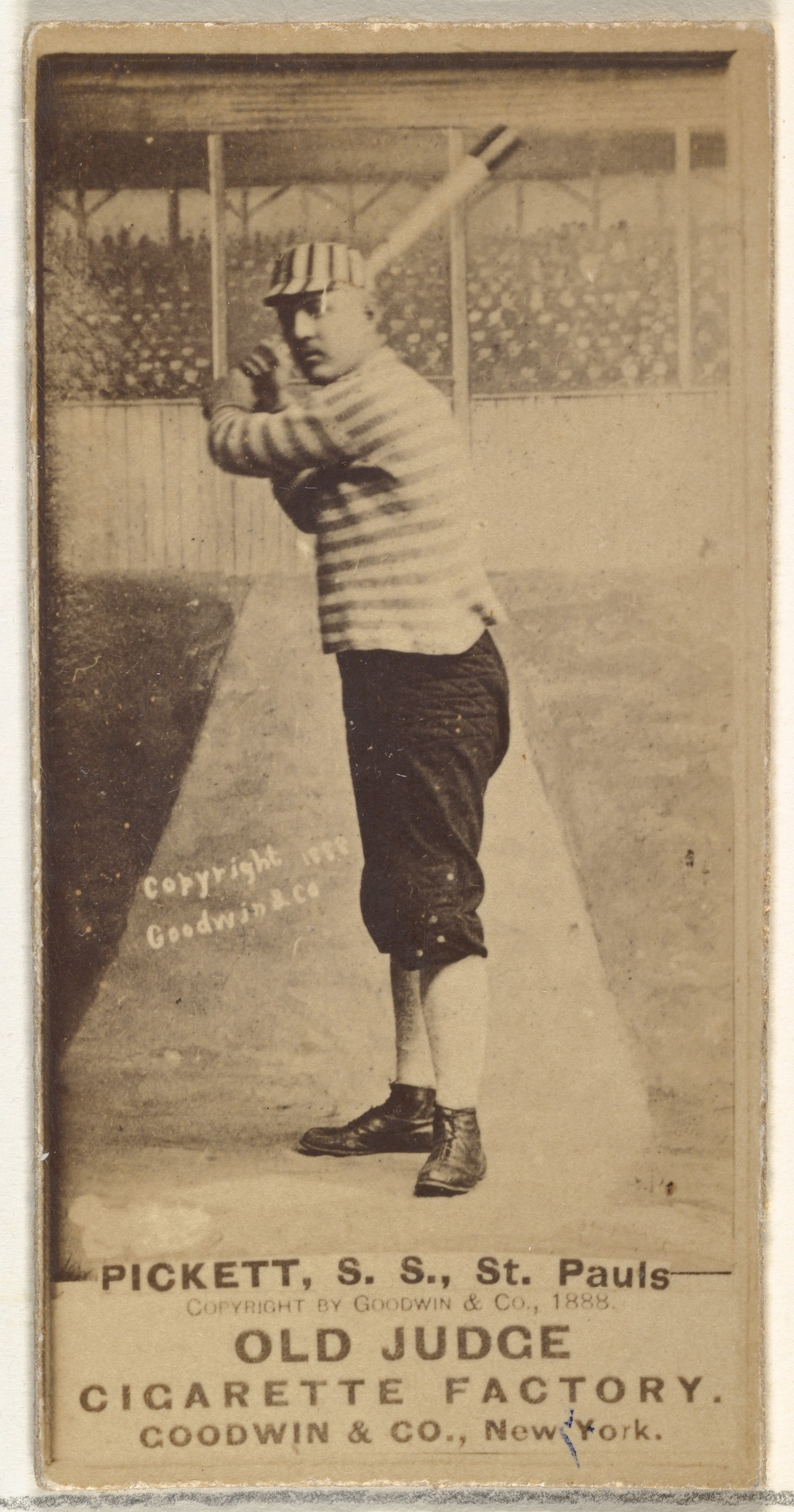
(1898) John Pickett, Old Judge series baseball card. Pickett managed Green Bay from 1908 to 1911.

In 1908, the Green Bay "Tigers" continued play as the Wisconsin State League changed names to become the Wisconsin-Illinois League, remaining a Class D level league. The name change occurred after the Rockford Reds joined Freeport as Illinois based teams in the league.

The Green Bay team was known as the "Tigers" in 1908. The Tigers ended the season in fourth place and finished the season with 65–58 record. The Tigers placed fourth in the eight–team Wisconsin-Illinois League standings under managers John Corrigan and John Pickett. Pickett began a four-year tenure as the Green Bay manager. Green Bay ended the season 8.0 games behind the champion Wausau Lumberjacks.

The Green Bay "Bays" nickname returned in 1909 as the team finished in second place in the eight-team Class D level Wisconsin-Illinois League final standings. The Bays ended the 1909 season with a record of 69–54, playing the season under returning manager John Pickett. Green Bay ended the season 7.0 games behind the first place Madison Senators.

Joining the Green Bay Bays during the 1910 season after being purchased from the Des Moines Boosters, pitcher Joe Benz had early success with Green Bay. On July 19, 1910, Bentz pitched both games of a doubleheader against Racine and won both games by the score of 2–0. After pitching the doubleheader, Bentz developed arm trouble, but returned to throw a one hit shutout against Fond du Lac in September. Bentz had a 12–10 overall record for Green Bay in 1910 and rejoined Des Moines in 1911. Benz mostly threw two main pitches, which were the spitball and the knuckleball.

The 1910 Wisconsin-Illinois League was upgraded to become a Class C level league from a Class D level league. In 1910, the number of minor leagues at the Class D level expanded from 13 leagues in 1909 to 29 in the 1910 minor league season. Continuing play in the 1910 eight-team Wisconsin-Illinois League, the Green Bay Bays ended the season in fifth place, as the team was led by returning manager John Pickett. The Bays finished with a record of 59–61, ending the season 15½ games behind the first place Appleton Papermakers.

The Green Bay Bays were on the losing end of two no-hit games against the Aurora Blues in 1911. On May 18, 1911, Earl Daniels, pitching for Aurora threw a no-hitter in a 2–0 victory over the Bays. On August 4, 1911, Daniels' Aurora teammate Len Madden threw a second no–hitter against the Green Bay, defeating them 3–0.

In 1911, Green Bay Bays placed third in the eight-team Wisconsin-Illinois League. The Bays ended the season with a record of 61–56 in playing the final season under manager John Pickett. The Rockford Wolverines won the championship with a final record of 74–46 and finished 11½ games ahead of Green Bay.

With Jim Garry becoming the manager, Green Bay placed fifth in the 1912 Wisconsin-Illinois League standings. The Bays ended the season with a record of 61–68, as Oshkosh won the first of three consecutive league championships and finished 24½ games ahead of the fifth place Green Bay in the Class C level eight-team league. Green Bay Bays player Earl Smith hit 12 home runs to lead the Wisconsin-Illinois League.

The Green Bay Bays improved to a third-place finish in the 1913 Class C level Wisconsin-Illinois League. In the eight-team league, the Bays compiled a final record of 69–57, with Bobby Lynch becoming the manager. The Bays ended the season 8½ games behind the Oshkosh Indians in the eight-team league final standings, as Oshkosh won their second consecutive championship. Green Bay had two players that were league leaders. Fred Thomas scored 81 runs to lead the league and Fritz Mollwitz had 154 total hits to lead the Wisconsin-Illinois League.

In 1914, the Green Bay Bays played their final season as members of the eight–team Class C level Wisconsin-Illinois League. Green Bay joined the Appleton Papermakers, Madison Senators, Marinette-Menominee Twins, Oshkosh Indians, Racine Belles, Rockford Wolves and Wausau Lumberjacks teams in playing the final season of the league.

The Green Bay Bays challenged the Oshkosh Indians for the 1914 Wisconsin-Illinois League championship, finishing second in the final standings. With an overall record of 73–51 to place second, Green Bay was led by returning manager Bobby Lynch. First place Oshkosh finished 5.0 games ahead of the second place Green Bay Bays in the final Wisconsin-Illinois League standings.

The Wisconsin-Illinois League never reformed, permanently folded after completing the 1914 season. Green Bay next hosted minor league baseball in 1940, when the Green Bay Bluejays began a tenure of play in returning to the reformed Wisconsin State League.

== The ballparks ==
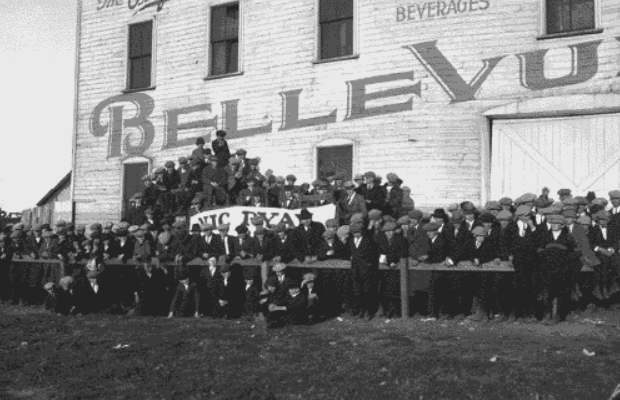
(1923) Bellevue Park. Green Bay, Wisconsin.

Green Bay first hosted games at a ballpark located near today's City Park. The location corresponds to Hagemeister Park. Hagemeister Park served as the first home of the Green Bay Packers of the National Football League from 1919 to 1922. Originally called Washington Park, it was renamed to Hagemeister Park in 1899, as it was owned by the Hagemeister Brewery. The ballpark was torn down in 1923 to make way for the new Green Bay East High School.

Beginning in 1902, the Green Bay teams next hosted home minor league games at Bellevue Park. The ballpark was torn down in 1928.

Besides serving as a minor league baseball park, Bellevue Park became home of the Green Bay Packers in 1923 and 1924. Bellevue Park was the second home venue of the Packers, who had previously played their home games at Hagemeister Park. During their tenure at Bellevue Park, the Packers had game attendance ranging from 4,000 to 5,000 fans.

The ballpark was located just east of the Hagemeister Brewery, which was renamed the "Bellevue Products Co." during Prohibition. The site was located just east of Baird Creek on Main Street in the Green Bay village of Preble, Wisconsin.

== Timeline ==
Year(s)	# Yrs.	Team	Level	League	Ballpark
1891	1	Green Bay Dock Wallopers	Independent	Wisconsin State League	Hagemeister Park
1892	1	Green Bay Bays	Independent	Wisconsin-Michigan League	Hagemeister Park
1902	1	Green Bay Bays	Independent	Wisconsin State League	Hagemeister Park
1905–1906	2	Green Bay Colts	Class D	Wisconsin State League	Bellevue Park
1907	1	Green Bay Orphans	Class D	Wisconsin State League	Bellevue Park
1908	1	Green Bay Tigers	Class D	Wisconsin State League	Bellevue Park
1909	2	Green Bay Bays	Class D	Wisconsin-Illinois League	Bellevue Park
1910–1914	5	Green Bay Bays	Class C	Wisconsin-Illinois League	Bellevue Park

== Year-by-year records ==
Year	Record	Finish	Manager	Playoffs/notes
1891	48–42	3rd	Thomas Murray / George Brackett	No playoffs held
1892	48–39	1st	Louis Shoeneck / Sam LaRocque	League champions No playoffs held
1905	47–62	6th	William Kennelly / William McGinnis; Mart McQuaid / Ernest Van Erman / Warren Beckwith	No playoffs held
1906	55–63	4th	George Bubser / Phil Stremmel	No playoffs held
1907	48–73	7th	Ira Hastings / John Corrigan	No playoffs held
1908	65–58	4th	John Corrigan / John Pickett	No playoffs held
1909	69–54	2nd	John Pickett	No playoffs held
1910	59–61	5th	John Pickett	No playoffs held
1911	61–56	3rd	John Pickett	No playoffs held
1912	61–68	5th	Jim Garry	No playoffs held
1913	69–57	3rd	Bobby Lynch	No playoffs held
1914	73–61	2nd	Bobby Lynch	No playoffs held

== Notable alumni ==
- Alex Beam (1892)
- Joe Benz (1910)
- Felix Chouinard (1909–1910, 1913)
- Bert Cunningham (1892)
- Adam DeBus (1914)
- Biddy Dolan (1908)
- Dan Dugdale (1892)
- Jack Easton (1892)
- Danny Friend (1891)
- Eddie Fusselback (1891–1892)
- Jim Garry (1912, MGR)
- Ducky Hemp (1891)
- George Henry (1892)
- Larry Hoffman (1909)
- Jim Hughey (1891)
- Joe Kappel (1891)
- Charlie Kavanagh (1913)
- Charlie Krehmeyer (1891)
- Sam LaRocque (1891; 1892, MGR)
- Tom Letcher (1892)
- George McMillan (1891))
- Mart McQuaid (1905, MGR)
- Dusty Miller (1892)
- Frank Miller (1908)
- Fritz Mollwitz (1910–1913)
- Red Ormsby (1909–1914)
- Ed Pabst (1891)
- John Pickett (1908–1911, MGR)
- John Rainey (1892)
- William Rohrer (1909–1914)
- Frank Scanlan (1913–1914)
- Jumbo Schoeneck (1892)
- Earl Smith (1911–1912)
- Phenomenal Smith (1892)
- Andy Sommers (1891)
- Ben Stephens (1891)
- Phil Stremmel (1905; 1906, MGR; 1907)
- Tom Tennant (1905–1906)
- Fred Thomas (1913)
- Paul Wachtel (1912)
- Austin Walsh (1913)
- Joe Weiss (1914)
- Pat Wright (1891)

== See also ==
- Green Bay Bays players
- Green Bay Colts players
- Green Bay Dock Wallopers players
