= Oshkosh Indians =

- 1891–1914; (1886–1887, 1891–1892, 1902, 1905–1914); Oshkosh, Wisconsin

Minor league affiliations
- Class: Independent (1891–1892, 1886–1887, 1902); Class D (1905–1909); Class C (1910–1914)
- League: Northwestern League (1886–1887); Wisconsin State League (1891); Wisconsin-Michigan League (1892); Wisconsin State League (1902, 1905–1907); Wisconsin-Illinois League (1909–1914)

Major league affiliations
- Team: None

Minor league titles
- League titles (4): 1892; 1912; 1913; 1914

Team data
- Name: Oshkosh (1886–1887); Oshkosh Indians (1891–1892, 1902, 1905–1914)
- Ballpark: Jackson Street Grounds (1886–1887, 1891–1892, 1902); White City Park (1905–1914)

The Oshkosh Indians were a minor league baseball team based in Oshkosh, Wisconsin, playing between 1891 and 1914.

In 1886 and 1887, the "Indians" were preceded in minor league play by the "Oshkosh" team of the Northwestern League, who won the 1887 league championship.

The Oshkosh "Indians" first played under the nickname as members of the 1891 Wisconsin State League, followed by memberships in the Wisconsin-Michigan League (1892) and Wisconsin State League (1902, 1905–1908). The Indians continued play from 1909 to 1914 in the Class C level Wisconsin-Illinois League after the Wisconsin State League changed names. The Indians won three consecutive Wisconsin-Illinois League championships from 1912 to 1914. The Indians ceased play when the Wisconsin-Illinois League permanently folded following their championship season in 1914.

Oshkosh had two Baseball Hall of Fame members serve as managers. Frank Selee managed the 1887 Oshkosh team to the league championship and Kid Nichols was a player/manager for the Indians in 1908 in his final professional season as a player.

The Oshkosh teams hosted minor league home games at the Jackson Street Grounds through 1902 and the New White City Park from 1905 to 1914.

== History ==
=== 1886 & 1887 Northwestern League ===
Oshkosh began minor league play in 1886, when the "Oshkosh" team became members of the six-team independent Northwestern League. The league was reformed with Oshkosh joining the Duluth Jayhawks, Eau Claire Lumbermen, St. Paul Freezers, Minneapolis Millers and Milwaukee Brewers teams in beginning play on May 8, 1886.

Duluth won the 1886 Northwestern League championship, finishing 6.5 games ahead of third place Oshkosh. Ending the season with a record of 39-39, Oshkosh played their first season under managers William Harrington, William Roche and Walt Kinzie. Oshkosh began play at the Jackson Street Grounds ballpark.

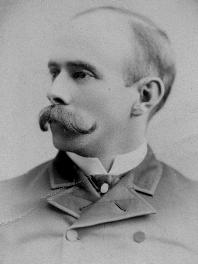
(1890) Baseball Hall of Fame member Frank Selee. Selee managed the 1887 Oshkosh team to the Northwestern League championship.

In 1887, Oshkosh won the league championship as the Northwestern League continued play, becoming an eight-team league, having added franchises. The new Des Moines Hawkeyes, LaCrosse Freezers and St. Paul Saints joined the Duluth Freezers, Eau Claire Lumberman, Milwaukee Cream Citys, Oshkosh and Minneapolis Millers in the league. Oshkosh won the championship.

Ending the 1887 season with a record of 76–41 in winning the championship, Baseball Hall of Fame member Frank Selee was the Oshkosh manager. Selee was instrumental in building the team's championship roster. Ending the season with a final record of 76–41, Oshkosh finished just .005 ahead of the second place (78–43) Milwaukee Cream Cities (.650 to .645) in the final standings. No playoffs were held, as was common in the era. The Northwestern League did not return to play in 1888.

As Oshkosh manager, Selee had convinced the Oshkosh team owners to sign numerous players, including Tommy McCarthy, Tom Lovett and Dummy Hoy before the championship 1887 season. After winning the championship in Oshkosh, Selee was hired to manage Omaha Omahogs of the Western Association in 1888, receiving a reported $3,000 to manage the team. Selee led Omaha to two consecutive league championships seasons as manager. While at Omaha, Selee also signed future Hall of Fame member and future Oshkosh manager Kid Nichols as a teenager, before moving to manage the Boston Beaneaters (today's Atlanta Braves) beginning in 1890. In Boston, Selee signed Nichols to a major league contract, and Nichols began his own Hall of Fame career. In 1908, Nichols became player/manager of the Oshkosh Indians in his final year as a professional player.

=== 1891 & 1892 Wisconsin State League ===
In 1891, Oshkosh returned to minor league play when the Oshkosh "Indians" became charter members of the Wisconsin State League. The Appleton Papermakers, Fond du Lac Mudhens, Green Bay Dock Wallopers, Marinette Lumber Shovers and Oconto Log Drivers teams joined with Oshkosh in the six–team Wisconsin State League.

The Oshkosh "Indians" nickname corresponds to local history. The city of Oshkosh was named for the Menominee leader Chief Oshkosh. His name means "claw." (cf. Ojibwe oshkanzh, "the claw").

Oshkosh finished in fourth place in the 1891 Wisconsin State League standings. Playing under managers John Roushkolb and Daniel Sweeney, the Indians ended the season with a record of 46–44. Marinette won the championship and finished 2.5 games ahead of the second place Appleton Papermakers, 3.0 games ahead of Green Bay and 5.0 games ahead of Oshkosh in the final standings.

In 1892, the Oshkosh Indians continued play as charter members of the six-team Michigan-Wisconsin League. The league formed for the 1892 season as a non–signatory, Independent level league. The Green Bay Bays, Ishpeming-Negaunee Unions, Marinette Badgers, Marquette Undertakers and Menominee Wolverines teams joined Oshkosh as charter members.

In 1892, the Oshkosh Indians placed fourth in the Michigan-Wisconsin League final standings after the league lost two teams during the season. The Indians finished with a record of 41–50, playing the season under manager Charles Faatz. After the season began on May 37, 1892, the Green Bay Bays won the 1892 Michigan-Wisconsin League with a 48–39 record in the six–team league, finishing 6.0 games ahead of Oshkosh. Green Bay was followed by the Menominee Wolverines (44–40), Marinette Badgers (45–44) and Oshkosh in the final standings. The Marquette Undertakers (20–29) and Ishpeming-Negaunee Unions (24–20) teams folded during the season.

During the 1892 season, Green Bay president Frank W. Murphy, who also served the dual role as president of the league created controversy in winning the championship. It was reported that Murphy had secretly upgraded the Green Bay roster during the season with a new manager and players, uniforms and equipment. Numerous players were obtained from the Terre Haute Hottentots and other teams en route to winning the championship. New manager Sam LaRocque was obtained from Terre Haute during the 1892 season and all the former players were released. The Michigan-Wisconsin League permanently folded following the 1892 season.

=== 1905 to 1907 Wisconsin State League ===
After a decade without a minor league team, Oshkosh returned to Wisconsin State League play in 1902, managed by W.J. O'Rourke. The league reformed as an eight-team league. Final standings and records for the season are unknown, The league did not play as a minor league in 1903.

In 1905, the Wisconsin State League reformed, and Oshkosh joined the league, playing home games at the newly constructed White City Park ballpark. The Oshkosh Indians resumed minor league baseball play as members of six–team Class D level Wisconsin State League, also called the "Wisconsin Association," with all league teams based in Wisconsin. The Indians joined the Beloit Collegians, Freeport Pretzels, Green Bay Colts, La Crosse Pinks, and Wausau Lumberjacks teams in league play.

The 1905 Oshkosh Indians ended their first season of Wisconsin State League play in second place, led by the hitting of Frank DuChein and the pitching of Fred Beebe. With a record of 60–47, the Indians placed second in the Wisconsin State League standings, finishing 7.0 games behind the champion LaCrosse Pinks (68–41). Morey Crall and John Lavie were the 1905 Oshkosh managers. Frank DuChien of Oshkosh won the league batting title, hitting .303, with a league leading 125 total hits. Indians' pitcher Fred Beebe had 27 wins and 291 strikeouts to lead the Wisconsin State League in both categories.

In their second season of minor league play, the 1906 Oshkosh Indians continued as members of the six-team Wisconsin State League. The Indians ended the 1906 season with a 56–63 record, finishing third in the league standings under manager Charlie Hanford. Oshkosh finished 20.5 games behind the first place LaCrosse Pinks in the final standings. The LaCrosse nickname was in reference to their manager Pink ahawley, who would later become the LaCrosse manager.

The Oshkosh Indians continued play as the 1907 Wisconsin State League expanded to eight teams, adding the Madison Senators and Fond du Lac Webfoots as expansion franchises. The league remained classified as a Class D level league. Oshkosh ended the Wisconsin State League regular season in fifth place. With a record of 58–65, playing under manager George Bubser, the Indians finished 22.0 games behind the first place Freeport Pretzels in the eight–team league. The league had no playoffs, with the regular season first place team winning the championship.

=== 1908 to 1911 Wisconsin-Illinois League ===
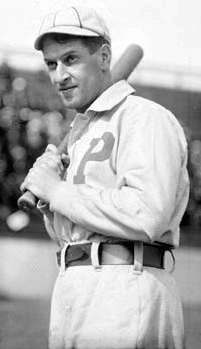
(1905) Baseball Hall of Fame member Kid Nichols, Philadelphia Phillies. Nichols was the player/manager for Oshkosh in 1908.

In 1908, Oshkosh continued play as the Wisconsin State League changed names to become the Wisconsin-Illinois League, remaining a Class D level league. The name change occurred after the Rockford Reds joined Freeport as Illinois based teams in the league.

During the 1908 season, Baseball Hall of Fame member Kid Nichols joined Oshkosh during the season as a pitcher-manager. It was the last season Nichols appeared as a professional player. Taking over as manager in July, Nichols guided Oshkosh to a 34–31 record under his managerial guidance. At age 38, Nichols played himself in 35 games during the season and he had a 3–1 record as a pitcher for Oshkosh. His Oshkosh play was the final of his career, giving him a career record as a professional pitcher of 495–258.

In 1908, Oshkosh played a Wisconsin-Illinois League 23-inning game at Fond du Lac, winning by the score of 4–2.

The 1908 Oshkosh Indians ended the season in seventh place and finished the season with 55–66 record. The Indians placed sixth in the eight–team Wisconsin-Illinois League standings under managers the returning George Bubser, who was replaced by Kid Nichols, The Indians ended the season 17.0 games behind the champion Wausau Lumberjacks.

The 1909 Oshkosh Indians finished in seventh place in the eight-team Class D level Wisconsin-Illinois League final standings. The Indians ended the 1909 season with a record of 52–72 losses, placing seventh for the second consecutive season. The 1909 Oshkosh manager was former La Crosse manager Pink Hawley, as the Indians ended the season 24.5 games behind the first place Madison Senators. Tom Coates of Oshkosh had 151 total hits to lead the league.

The 1910 Wisconsin-Illinois League was upgraded to become a Class C league in 1910, as the minor leagues expanded greatly, growing from 13 Class D level leagues in 1909 to 29 Class D level leagues in 1910. Continuing play in the 1910 eight-team Wisconsin-Illinois League, Oshkosh ended the season in seventh place for the third consecutive season. The Indians finished with a record of 51–72, playing the season under manager Earl Burwell. Oshkosh ended the season 24.5 games behind the first place Appleton Papermakers in the final standings, and ahead of only the last place Aurora Islanders.

In 1911, Oshkosh broke their streak of three consecutive seventh places by placing fifth in the Wisconsin-Illinois League. The Indians ended the season with a record of 61–64 playing under managers Howdy Cassiboine and Bill Warren. Warren had played for Oshkosh in three previous seasons. The Rockford Wolverines won the championship with a final record of 74–46 and finished 15.5 games ahead of fifth place Oshkosh. Indians' pitcher Bruce Noel won 28 games to lead the Wisconsin-Illinois League and all of the minor leagues.

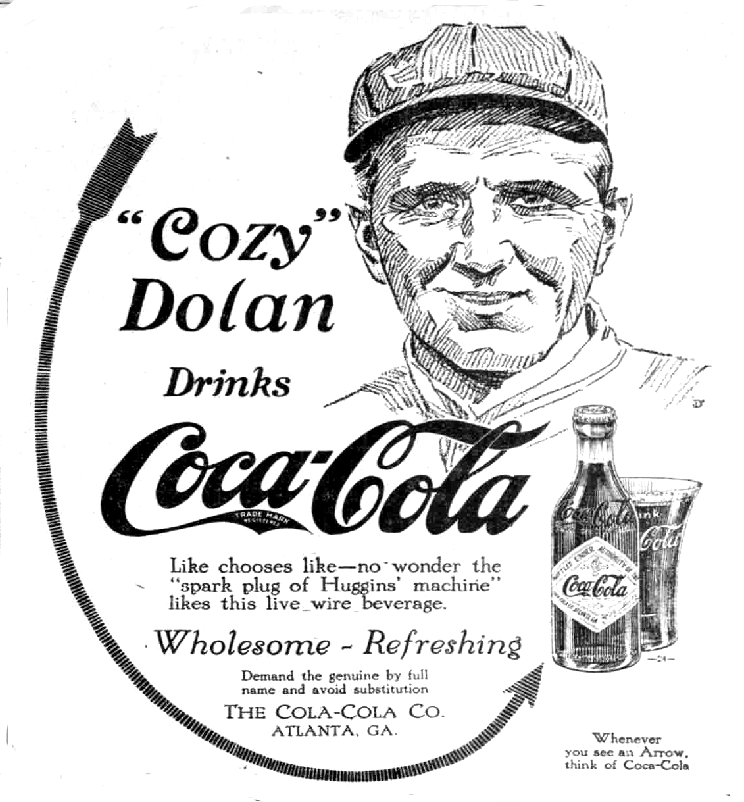
(1915) Cozy Dolan Coca-Cola advertisement. Dolan was an Oshkosh native and played for the Indians from 1905 to 1908.

=== 1912 to 1914 - Three Wisconsin-Illinois League championships ===
In 1912, the Oshkosh Indians won the first of three consecutive Wisconsin-Illinois League championships, all with Joe Killian managing Oshkosh. John Kluwin became president of the team beginning in 1912. Kluwin was a local attorney in Oshkosh. In winning their first league championship, Oshkosh finished 5.5 games ahead of the second place Racine Belles in the Class C level eight-team league. The Indians ended the season with a record of 87–45 under manager Joe Killian. Killian had been a catcher in the league for four seasons with the Freeport Pretzels and Lacrosse Pinks teams from 1905 to 1908. Killian came to Oshkosh after serving as player/manager of the Winona Pirates in the Minnesota-Wisconsin League from 1990 to 1911. Killian often told his teams "Let's go now, it's never too late to win."

The 1913 Oshkosh Indians defended their Wisconsin-Illinois League championship. In the eight-team league, the Indians compiled a final record of 74–46. With a record of 72–51, the Racine Belles again finished in second place, 4.0 games behind Oshkosh in the eight-team Class C level league Final standings. Oshkosh returning manager Joe Killian led the team to the second consecutive championship. Albert "Bull" Durham of Oshkosh hit 26 home runs to lead the Wisconsin-Illinois League.

In the midst of their championship run in the Wisconsin-Illinois League, the Oshkosh Indians had a book published in July, 1913. The club published the book titled Oshkosh in baseball.

In 1914, the Oshkosh Indians played their final season as members of the eight–team Class C level Wisconsin-Illinois League. Oshkosh joined the Appleton Papermakers, Green Bay Bays, Madison Senators, Marinette-Menominee Twins, Racine Belles, Rockford Wolves and Wausau Lumberjacks teams in the final season of league play.

The Oshkosh Indians won the 1914 Wisconsin-Illinois League championship, their third consecutive league title, all led by manager Joe Killian. With an overall record of 75–43 to place first in the final standings. Joe Killian again led the Indians to the title, as Oshkosh finished 5.0 games ahead of the second place Green Bay Bays in the final Wisconsin-Illinois League standings. Ih helping the team to the championship, "Bull" Durham of Oshkosh hit 25 home runs and scored 87 runs to lead the Wisconsin-Illinois League in both categories, while pitcher Joe Lotz had 24 wins and 267 strikeouts, tops in the league.

The Wisconsin-Illinois League never reformed, permanently folded after completing the 1914 season.

In 1923 and 1924 seasons, an Oshkosh team played as members of the semi-professional "Wisconsin State League." Oshkosh next hosted minor league baseball in 1941, when the Oshkosh Giants began a tenure of play in returning to the reformed Wisconsin State League.

== The ballparks ==
Oshkosh hosted home minor league games at the Jackson Street Grounds beginning in the 1886 season. Today, the site is still in use as a public park called East Hall Park, containing four ballfields. The East Hall Park is located at Jackson Street and West New York Avenue in Oshkosh, Wisconsin.

In 1905, Oshkosh began play at the newly built White City Park Ballpark. The wooden grandstand ballpark hosted the Oshkosh teams through 1914 in two locations. The final ballpark was located near the former White City Park location in neighboring Kaukauna, Wisconsin. The ballpark was first located within the White City amusement park. In 1906, the name of the park was changed from Electric City to White City after the park was purchased by J. Francis Miller of Chicago. The name change was due to all the buildings in the 18-acre park being painted white. In 1910, the amusement park closed, resulting in the ballpark being dismantled and relocated to the new site. The amusement park reopened in 1917 as EWECO Park.

== Timeline ==
Year(s)	# Yrs.	Team	Level	League	Ballpark
1886–1897	2	Oshkosh	Independent	Northwestern League	Jackson Street Grounds
1891	1	Oshkosh Indians	Independent	Wisconsin State League	Jackson Street Grounds
1892	1	Oshkosh Indians	Independent	Wisconsin-Michigan League	Jackson Street Grounds
1902	1	Oshkosh Indians	Independent	Wisconsin State League	Jackson Street Grounds
1905–1907	3	Oshkosh Indians	Class D	Wisconsin State League	White City Park
1908–1909	2	Oshkosh Indians	Class D	Wisconsin-Illinois League	White City Park
1910–1914	5	Oshkosh Indians	Class C	Wisconsin-Illinois League	White City Park

== Year-by-year records ==
Year	Record	Finish	Manager	Playoffs/notes
1886	39–39	3rd	William Harrington / William Roche / Walt Kinzie	No playoffs held
1887	476–41	1st	Frank Selee	League champions No playoffs held
1891	46–44	4th	John Roushkolb / Daniel Sweeney	No playoffs held
1892	41–50	4th	Charles Faatz	No playoffs held
1905	60–47	2nd	Morey Crall / John Lavie	No playoffs held
1906	56–63	3rd	Charlie Hanford	No playoffs held
1907	58–65	5th	George Bubser	No playoffs held
1908	55–66	7th	George Bubser / Kid Nichols	No playoffs held
1909	52–72	7th	Pink Hawley	No playoffs held
1910	51–72	7th	Earl Burwell	No playoffs held
1911	61–64	5th	Howdy Cassiboine / Bill Warren	No playoffs held
1912	87–45	1st	Joe Killian	League champions No playoffs held
1913	74–46	1st	Joe Killian	League champions No playoffs held
1914	75–43	1st	Joe Killian	League champions No playoffs held

== Notable alumni ==
- Kid Nichols (1908, MGR Inducted Baseball Hall of Fame, 1949
- Frank Selee (1887, MGR) Inducted Baseball Hall of Fame, 1999
- Bill Armour (1891)
- Gus Alberts (1892)
- Fred Beebe (1905)
- Frank Bishop (1886)
- Bill Burdick (1887)
- Willian Burke (1887)
- Jim Burns (1886–1887)
- Charlie Cady (1886))
- Jimmy Cooney (1887)
- Fred Curtis (1908)
- Cozy Dolan (1905–1908) Lifetime suspension
- Howard Earl (1892)
- Roy Evans (1892)
- Chauncey Fisher (1892)
- Bill Garfield (1891)
- Ed Gastfield (1886–1887)
- Heinie Groh (1908–1910) Cincinnati Reds Hall of Fame
- Charlie Hallstrom (1886)
- Charlie Hanford (1906, MGR)
- George Harper (1886)
- Pink Hawley (1909, MGR)
- Belden Hill (1891)
- George Hogreiver (1892)
- Dummy Hoy (1887)
- Charlie Ingraham (1886)
- Leo Kavanagh (1914)
- Walt Kinzie (1886, MGR)
- Gus Krock (1886–1887)
- Joe Lotz (1914)
- Tom Lovett (1887)
- Tommy McCarthy (1887)
- Ed McKenna (1886)
- Tommy Mee (1905–1914)
- Con Murphy (1887)
- Tom Nagle (1887)
- Pat O'Connell (1887)
- Dan O'Connor (1892)
- Ed Pabst (1891)
- Chick Pedroes (1892)
- George Rooks (1886)
- Frank Rooney (1910–1911)
- Edward Santry (1886)
- Taylor Shafer (1887)
- Dan Shannon (1887)
- John Slagle (1892)
- Ace Stewart (1892)
- Harry Sullivan (1907)
- Tom Tennant (1905)
- Bill Van Dyke (1886)
- Bill Warren (1907–1908, 1910; 1911, MGR; 1912)
- Art Watson (1910)
- Doc Watson (baseball) (1912)
- Wash Williams (1886)
- Tug Wilson (1887)
- Joe Wright (1892)
- Oshkosh Indians players
- Oshkosh (minor league baseball) players
