= Oconto Log Drivers =

- 1891; Oconto, Wisconsin

Minor league affiliations
- Class: Independent (1891)
- League: Wisconsin State League (1891)

Major league affiliations
- Team: None

Minor league titles
- League titles (0): None

Team data
- Name: Oconto Log Drivers (1891)
- Ballpark: Oconto athletic park (1891)

The Oconto Log Drivers were a minor league baseball team based in Oconto, Wisconsin and Oconto County, Wisconsin. The "Log Drivers" played as members of the 1891 independent Wisconsin State League, finishing the season in last place in their only season of minor league play.

Despite their last place finish, twelve members of the Oconto team roster played major league baseball. Moses Fleetwood Walker was noted to have played for Oconto in 1891, his final season as a player.

== History ==
Oconto first fielded a minor league team in 1891, when the Oconto "Log Drivers" became charter members of the Wisconsin State League. Oconto played in 1891, with the Appleton Papermakers, Fond du Lac Mudhens, Green Bay Dock Wallopers, Marinette Lumber Shovers and Oshkosh Indians teams joining Oconto in the six–team Wisconsin State League. The league began play on May 14, 1891.

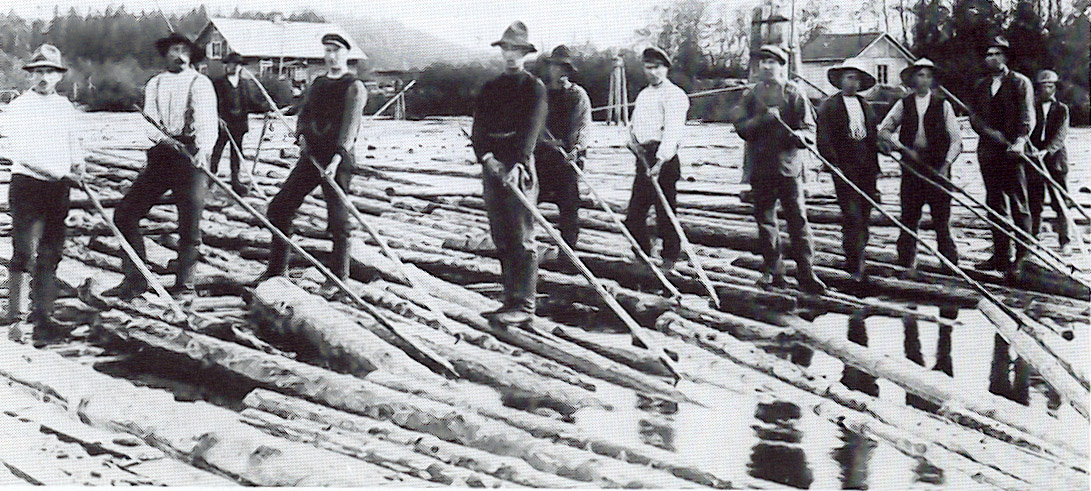
(1918) Log Drivers.

The "Log Drivers" nickname corresponds to local geography and history. With available lumber, the first sawmill opened in Oconto, Wisconsin in 1829. At its peak, there were twelve mills in the city. The Log driving position is defined as the one that guides logs in a downstream working with a pike pole from a riverbank or a boat or on the floating logs themselves.

Oconto finished in last place as Marinette won the 1891 Wisconsin State League championship. Playing under managers John Guehrer, John Carey and William Harrington, the Log Drivers placed sixth in the league standings with a record of 35–54. The first place Marinette Lumber Shovers finished 15.5 games ahead of Oconto. The Log Drivers were also 13.0 games behind the second place Appleton Papermakers in the final standings of the six-team league. George Flynn of Oconto won the Wisconsin State League batting title, with a .309 average.

Oconto did not return to minor league play. In 1892, the Wisconsin State league evolved to become the Wisconsin–Michigan League, and it formed without an Oconto franchise. The league played in the 1892 season with the Green Bay Bays, Ishpeming-Negaunee Unions, Marinette Badgers, Marquette Undertakers, Menominee Wolverines and Oshkosh Indians teams as charter members.

In the era where segregation in baseball was beginning, Moses Fleetwood Walker was said to have played for Oconto in 1891 in his final season as a player. There are no statistics for Walker playing for Oconto. It is known that Walker had a murder trial and was acquitted in 1891 for an incident that occurred on April 9, 1891, in Syracuse, New York.

Like Walker, Piggy Ward was also noted to have briefly played for Oconto in 1891, despite not appearing in statistical records. A noted team jumper, Ward was said to have an 1891 season that began with the Sacramento Senators of the California League. Ward then left in secret and reported to the Spokane Bunchgrassers of the Pacific Northwest League, but was arrested for owing the Sacramento team $141, plus an additional $15 for a "suit of clothes." After his debt was settled, Ward played a handful of games for Spokane and then migrated to the Minneapolis Millers of the Western Association. He was playing well enough for the Millers, that the major league Pittsburgh Pirates purchased his contract from Minneapolis on August 12, 1891. After hitting .333 for Pittsburgh, he was released after a few games. Spokane had reacquired his contract. However, upon returning to Spokane, Ward stopped in Oconto and played a few games for the team, with his Oconto signing being reported on September 10, 1891, and his debut for the team occurring the next day against Oshkosh. Ward eventually finished the season playing for Spokane.

Two seasons later, Ward set a major league record (now shared with Earl D. Averill) for the most consecutive plate appearances resulting in officially reaching base (through a walk, a base hit or hit by a pitch). From June 16 to June 19, 1893, Ward officially reached base a record 17 times in 17 consecutive plate appearances. Ward had 8 hits, 8 walks and was hit by a pitch once in his 17 at bats.

Despite their last place finish, the 1891 Oconto historical roster contained twelve players who played major league baseball.

Oconto, Wisconsin has not hosted another minor league team.

== The ballpark ==
The 1891 Oconto Log Drivers likely played home games at an Oconto athletic park. An 1898 plot map of the city indicates a visible athletic facility was located on the north side of the city and that the plot was owned by Oconto. The corresponding location today is residential and would roughly be bordered by Quincy Street, Jones Avenue, Madison Street and Highway S in Oconto, Wisconsin.

== Year-by-year record ==
Year	Record	Finish	Manager	Playoffs/notes
1891	35–54	6th	John Guehrer / John Carey / William Harrington	No playoffs held

== Notable alumni ==
- Andy Dunning (1891)
- Joe Dowie (1891)
- Danny Friend (1891)
- George Flynn (1891)
- Jonh Kirby (1891)
- Dan Minnehan (1891)
- Emmett Rogers (1891)
- John Slagle (1891)
- Ace Stewart (1891)
- Kid Summers (1891)
- George Treadway (1891)
- Harry Truby (1891)
- Moses Fleetwood Walker (1891)
- Piggy Ward (1891)

== See also ==
- Oconto (minor league baseball) players
- Oconto Log Drivers players
