= Kosciuszko Reds =

Kosciusko Reds
- 1928–1936; (1928–1932, 1936); Milwaukee, Wisconsin

Minor league affiliations
- Class: Independent (1928–1932, 1936)
- League: Wisconsin State League (1928–1931); Wisconsin-Illinois League (1932); Wisconsin State League (1936)

Major league affiliations
- Team: None

Minor league titles
- League titles (0): None

Team data
- Name: Kosciusko Reds (1928–1930); Milwaukee Red Sox (1931–1932, 1936)
- Ballpark: Borchert Field (1928–1932, 1936)

The Kosciusko Reds were a minor league baseball team based in Milwaukee, Wisconsin. Representing the Polish south side of Milwaukee, the Kosciusko Reds played as a semi–pro team for many years before playing as members of the Independent Wisconsin State League from 1928 to 1930. The Milwaukee Red Sox continued as members of the Wisconsin State League in 1931 and 1936 and the 1932 Wisconsin-Illinois League.

The Kosciusko Reds and Milwaukee Red Sox teams hosted home minor league games at Borchert Field, which hosted baseball until 1953.

== History ==
=== Early Kosciusko Reds teams ===
The Kosciusko Reds were originally founded as a semi–pro team in 1908 by Milwaukee politician Louis Fons. The Kosciusko Reds represented the Polish south side of Milwaukee and were named after Tadeusz Kościuszko, a Polish patriot. The team was unofficially nicknamed, the “Koskys.”

The Kosciusko Reds made their debut on April 11, 1909, with owner Louis Fons playing 2nd base. The Reds won multiple titles in the semi–pro Lake Shore League. The team wore red and white uniforms and drew large crowds to South Side Park, their home ballpark, with the team and league playing games only on Sunday afternoons. The original Kosciusko Reds ceased play in 1920.

=== 1928–1930: Wisconsin State League ===
In 1928, the Kosciusko Reds franchise was revived as the minor league team became members of the reformed six–team Wisconsin State League. It appears the league held games weekly. The Kosciusko Reds ended the 1928 season with a record of 17–15, placing third in the Wisconsin State League standings, finishing 2.5 games behind the first place Two Rivers Mirros. Eddie Lenehan was the Reds' manager in 1928.

In their second Wisconsin State League season, the 1929 Kosciusko Reds finished with an 8–17 record, as the 1929 Wisconsin State League expanded to eight teams. The Reds ended the season in a tie for seventh place with the Madison Blues, finishing 5.5 games behind the first place Two Rivers Mirros.

The 1930 Kosciusko Reds played their final season under the name. Continuing play in the Wisconsin State League, the Reds ended the 1930 season with a record of 9–15, placing seventh in the league final standings, finishing 4.5 games behind the first place Racine Belles.

=== 1931: Wisconsin State League / Milwaukee Red Sox ===
For the 1931 Wisconsin State League season, the Milwaukee-based franchise became known as the Milwaukee Red Sox. The Milwaukee Red Sox were owned and managed by Eddie Stumpf, who had earlier managed the 1928 Union Oils, another Milwaukee-based franchise of the Wisconsin State League. The 1931 Milwaukee Red Sox finished fourth in the Wisconsin State League, which featured five teams. The 1931 Milwaukee team finished with a record of 8–10, 3.5 games behind the first place Sheboygan Chairmakers.

In May 1931, Milwaukee Red Sox owner/manager Eddie Stumpf arranged for the Red Sox to play a night game exhibition contest against the House of David baseball team at Borchert Field. The Milwaukee Red Sox borrowed lighting from the Kansas City Monarchs of the Negro leagues for the contest. The game was held on June 5, 1931, and the night game followed the Milwaukee Brewers (American Association) afternoon game. Baseball Hall of Fame member Grover Cleveland Alexander pitched for the House of David team against the Milwaukee Red Sox in front of a crowd of 8,000.

=== 1932: Wisconsin-Illinois League ===
In 1932, the Wisconsin State League became known as the Wisconsin-Illinois League, as the Milwaukee Red Sox continued play in the nine–team integrated league. The Milwaukee Red Sox finished with a record of 11–14, placing sixth in the final standings. The Red Sox finished 7.0 games behind the first place Harley Mills (Chicago) team. The Milwaukee minor league franchise folded after the 1932 season, there was no Milwaukee based team in the 1933 Wisconsin-Illinois League.

The Milwaukee Red Sox continued use of the moniker while playing in semi–pro leagues from 1933 to 1935, with Eddie Stumpf continuing as owner/manager. On June 11, 1935, the Red Sox played an exhibition game against a team of Japanese all-stars at Borchert Field. Attendance at the game was 1,400 and the Japanese All-Stars, aka Tokyo Giants with Eiji Sawamura won the game 9–4.

=== 1936: Final Wisconsin State League season ===
The Milwaukee Red Sox returned to minor league play as members of the 1936 Wisconsin State League, their final minor league season. The four–team league played a split–season schedule. The Milwaukee Red Sox finished with a record of 1–9, placing fourth in the first half. In the second half, Milwaukee had a 2–3 record to end in third place. The Red Sox' 3–12 overall record finished in fourth place. The Milwaukee franchise folded from the Wisconsin State League after the 1936 season.

== The ballparks ==
The Kosciusko Reds' original home minor league ballpark was South Side Park in Milwaukee. The ballpark, also called "Grove Street Park," opened in 1912. The ballpark had grandstands that could seat 5,000. Harrison street ran south of the ballpark and it was near St. Josaphat's Basilica. South Side Park was torn down in 1920.

The Kosciusko Reds and Milwaukee Red Sox teams played minor league home games at Borchert Field. Originally called "Athletic Park," the ballpark was built in 1888 for $40,000. The ballpark was renamed after the death of Milwaukee Brewers owner Otto Borchert in 1927. Besides the Reds, Borchert Field also hosted the Milwaukee Creams (1888–1894), Milwaukee Brewers (AA) (1891), Milwaukee Brewers (minor league baseball team) (1902–1952), Milwaukee Bears (Negro National League) (1923) and the Milwaukee Chicks of the All-American Girls Professional Baseball League (1944). The ballpark also hosted home National Football League games of the Milwaukee Badgers from 1922 to 1926 and the Green Bay Packers in 1933. In 1952, Mrs. Borchert sold the ballpark property to the city for $123,000 and it was soon cleared to make way for nearby roadway construction. The address of the ballpark was 3000 North 8th Street in Milwaukee, Wisconsin. Today, I-43 runs through the site of Borchert Field. A Borchert Field historical placard has been erected in the nearby neighborhood.

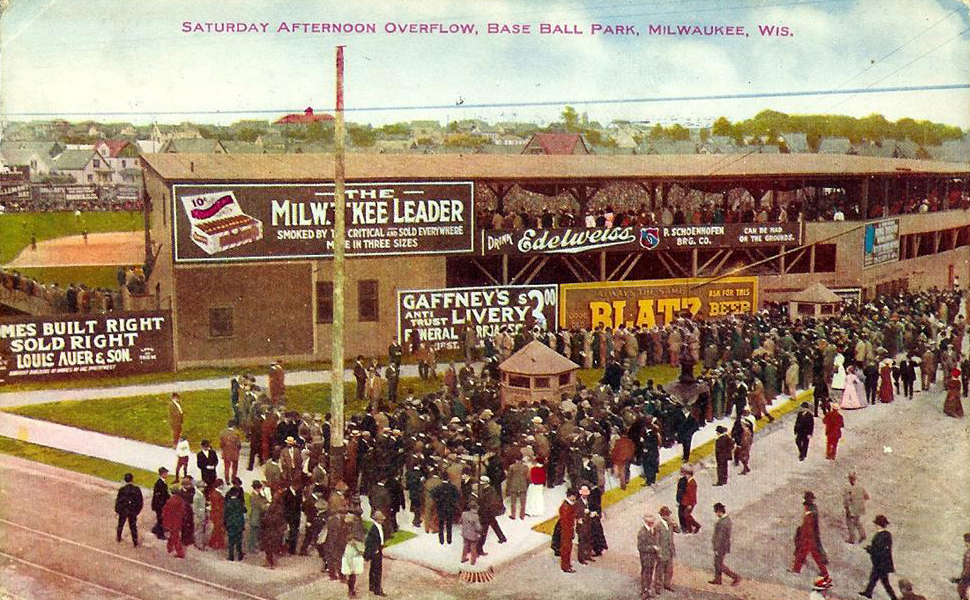
Borchert Field 1911

== Timeline ==
| Year(s) | # Yrs. | Team | Level | League | Ballpark |
|---|---|---|---|---|---|
| 1928–1930 | 3 | Kosciuszko Reds | Independent | Wisconsin State League | Borchert Field |
| 1931 | 1 | Milwaukee Red Sox | Independent | Wisconsin State League | Borchert Field |
| 1932 | 1 | Milwaukee Red Sox | Independent | Wisconsin-Illinois League | Borchert Field |
| 1936 | 1 | Milwaukee Red Sox | Independent | Wisconsin State League | Borchert Field |

== Year-by-year records ==
| Year | Record | Finish | Manager | Playoffs/Notes |
|---|---|---|---|---|
| 1928 | 17–15 | 3rd | Eddie Lenehan | No playoffs held |
| 1929 | 8–17 | 7th | N/A | No playoffs held |
| 1930 | 9–14 | 7th | N/A | No playoffs held |
| 1931 | 8–10 | 4th | Eddie Stumpf | No playoffs held |
| 1932 | 11–14 | 6th | Eddie Stumpf | No playoffs held |
| 1936 | 3–12 | 4th | Eddie Stumpf | No playoffs held |

== Notable alumni ==
- Mandy Brooks (1936)
- George Disch (1912)
- Louis Fons (1909, owner)
- Oscar Felsch (1915)
- Rube Lutzke (1932)
- Eddie Stumpf (1931–1932, 1936, MGR)

== See also ==
- Kosciuszko Reds players
- Milwaukee Red Sox players
- History of professional baseball in Milwaukee
