= Rockford Rox =

- 1871–1949; (1871, 1888, 1891–1892, 1895–1897, 1899, 1901–1904, 1908–1914, 1916–1917, 1919–1923, 1947–1949); Rockford, Illinois

Minor league affiliations
- Class: Independent (1871, 1888, 1891–1892); Class B (1895–1899) Class D (1901); Class B 1902–1904; Class D 1908–1914; Class B (1916–1917, 1919–1923); Class C (1947–1949)
- League: National Association of Base Ball Players (1871); Northwestern League (1879); Central Interstate League (1888); Illinois-Iowa League (1891–1892); Western Association (1895–1897, 1899); Illinois–Indiana–Iowa League (1901–1904); Wisconsin-Illinois League (1908-1911–1913); Wisconsin-Illinois League (1914); Illinois–Indiana–Iowa League(1916–1917, 1919–1923); Central Association (1947–1949)

Major league affiliations
- Team: Cincinnati Reds (1947-1949)

Minor league titles
- League titles (2): 1902; 1911

Team data
- Name: Rockford Forest Citys (1871); Rockford White Stockings (1879); Rockford (1888); Rockford Hustlers (1891–1892); Rockford Forest City (1895–1897); Rockford Rough Riders (1899); Rockford Red Sox (1901–1904); Rockford Reds (1908–1910); Rockford Wolverines (1911–1913); Rockford Wolves (1914); Rockford Wakes (1915–1916); Rockford Rox (1917, 1919–1923, 1947–1949)
- Ballpark: Agricultural Society Fair Grounds (1871); Fairgrounds Park (1879–1899); Kishwaukee Park (1901–1923); Blackhawk Park (1947–1949)

The Rockford Rox was the primary moniker of the minor league baseball teams based in Rockford, Illinois, between 1871 and 1949. In an era of early baseball, Rockford hosted teams in numerous leagues beginning in 1871. From 1916 to 1923, the Rox played in the Class B level Illinois–Indiana–Iowa League, and from 1947 to 1949, they played in the Class C level Central Association. The Rockford Rox were preceded by the Rockford Red Sox (1901–1904) and Rockford Wakes (1914–1916) in the Illinois–Indiana–Iowa League. Several other Rockford teams played in various leagues leading up to the Rox. The Rockford Rox were an affiliate of the Cincinnati Reds from 1947 to 1949.

During this era, Rockford was also home to the women's professional baseball Rockford Peaches of the AAGPBL from 1943 to 1954. The Rox were succeeded in minor league baseball by the 1988 Rockford Expos, who began play as members of the Midwest League.

== History ==
Minor league baseball began in Rockford, Illinois with the 1871 Rockford Forest Citys. The Forest Citys, also known as the "Forest City Club," played as members of the 1871 National Association, finishing with a record of 4–21, with Baseball Hall of Fame member Cap Anson on the team. This was one of the first professional leagues. Rockford had previously hosted amateur teams with the same name. Rockford played only the 1871 season in the National Association.

In 1879, the Rockford White Stockings played in the Northwestern League, where they finished with a record of 13–9.

Rockford became members of the Central Interstate League in 1888. On June 26, 1888, the Rockford team had a record of 11–23 when it disbanded.

In 1891, the Rockford Hustlers joined the Illinois-Iowa League, where they played two seasons. The Hustlers finished with a record of 54–47, to place 3rd in 1891. The Hustlers had a record of 46–38 and placed 2nd in 1892. After four teams in the league disbanded during the 1892 season, the Illinois-Iowa league folded when the season concluded.

Rockford Forest City (1895–1897) and the Rockford Rough Riders (1899) played os members of the Western Association. In their three seasons, Rockford Forest City finished with records of 66–60 (4th), 44–37 (4th) and 70–55 (3rd), disbanding after the 1897 season. The Rockford Rough Riders rejoined the Western Association in 1899. The Western Association disbanded on June 16, 1899, with the Rockford Rough Riders in 2nd place with a 20–16 record.

The 1901 Rockford Red Sox became charter members of the Illinois-Indiana-Iowa League (nicknamed the Three-I league). Rockford joined the Bloomington Blues, Cedar Rapids Rabbitts, Davenport River Rats, Decatur Commodores, Evansville River Rats, Rock Island Islanders and Terre Haute Hottentots as fellow charter members. After finishing with a record of 57–55 to place fourth in 1901, the Red Sox won the 1902 Illinois-Indiana-Iowa League Championship with a 74–52 record. After finishing last with a 48–76 record in 1904, Rockford folded after the season, replaced by the Peoria Distillers in the 1905 Illinois-Indiana-Iowa League.

In 1908, the Rockford Reds became charter members of the Wisconsin-Illinois League. The 1908 Reds were charter members of the Wisconsin-Illinois League, along with the Fond du Lac Cubs, Freeport Pretzels, Green Bay Tigers, LaCrosse Pinks, Madison Senators, Oshkosh Indians and Wausau Lumberjacks. The Rockford Reds (1908– 1910) were renamed the Rockford Wolverines (1911-1913) and Rockford Wolves (1914), while remaining in the Wisconsin-Illinois League. The 1911 Rockford Wolverines captured the Wisconsin-Illinois League Championship with a 74–46 record. The Wisconsin-Illinois League folded after the 1914 season.

In 1915, the Rockford Wakes rejoined the Illinois-Indiana-Iowa League, where Rockford played from 1915 to 1917 and 1919 to 1923. The Wakes finished with a record of 72–58, to place 3rd in 1915 and 67–66, to place fourth in 1916. The Rockford Rox (1917, 1919–1923) continued play in the "Three-I League", which did not play in 1918 due to World War I. The Rox finished second in the league in 1917, 1921 and 1923. The Rockford franchise folded from the Illinois-Indiana-Iowa League following the 1923 season.

The next professional team in Rockford were the famed Rockford Peaches, who played in the AAGPBL (1943–1954), when the women's league was formed during World War II. The Peaches claimed AAGPL championships in 1945, 1948, 1949, 1950. The Peaches played in every AAGPL season. They are featured prominently in the fictional film A League of Their Own.

In 1947, the Rockford Rox returned minor league baseball to Rockford after a 23–year absence. The 1947 Rockford Rox joined the reformed Central Association, along with the Burlington Indians, Clinton Cubs, Hannibal Pilots, Keokuk Pirates and Moline A's. The Rockford Rox were a minor league affiliate of the Cincinnati Reds from 1947 to 1949. The Rockford Rox placed third, fifth and sixth in their three seasons. The Central Association folded after the 1949 season.

After a 29–season absence, minor league baseball returned to Rockford, when the 1988 Rockford Expos began play as members of the Midwest League.

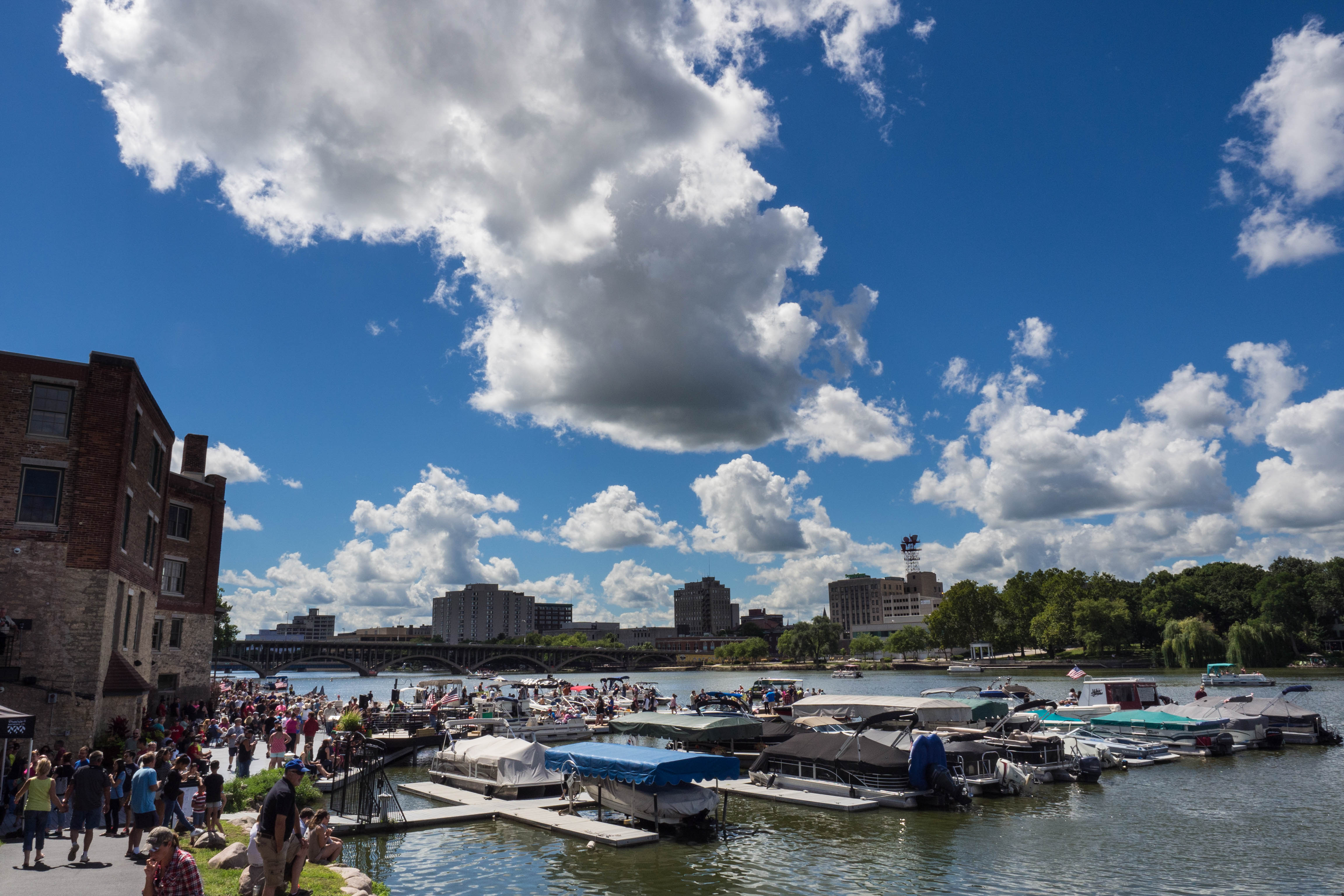
(2016) Rockford, Illinois

== The ballparks ==
The 1871 Rockford Forest Citys played at the Agricultural Society Fair Grounds.The ballpark had no outfield fences, only trees that surrounded the park. It was located at Kilburn Avenue & Mulberry Street, Rockford, Illinois.

In 1879, Rockford played at Fairgrounds Park. [per local newspapers]

The various Rockford clubs of the 1880s and 1890s played at several parks that are difficult to locate precisely.

By 1901, they were playing at Riverside Park, which was outside the city limits to the north.

In 1913, the club abandoned Riverside Park and moved to Kishwaukee Park. Also known as "Rockford Base Ball Park", Kishwaukee Park was located at 15th Avenue and Seminary Street in Rockford. This site would later be developed as Beyer Stadium. [per city directories and local newspapers] Some sources give an erroneous location.

In 1947–1949, the Rockford Rox played home games at Rox Park a.k.a. 15th Avenue Park, which was just east of and adjacent to the main Beyer Stadium, the home of the Rockford Peaches. [per local newspapers] Some sources say they played within Blackhawk Park, but the newspapers contradict that claim.

== Notable alumni ==
- Hal Carlson (1912, 1914-1916)
- Jim Canavan (1888)
- Phil Collins (1923)
- George Creamer (1879)
- Cozy Dolan (1909)
- John Dolan (1895)
- Bill Gleason (1891)
- Mike Golden (1879)
- Scott Hastings (1871, MGR)
- Davy Jones (1901)
- Ed Killian (1902-1903)
- Johnny Kling (1895, 1897)
- Art Kruger (1902)
- Algie McBride (1895)
- Dusty Miller (1892)
- Frank Miller (1908)
- Hugh Nicol (1879, 1891-1892, 1895-1896, 1901-1904)
- Paul O'Dea (1948, MGR)
- Dave Rowe (1879)
- Jack Rowe (1879)
- Billy Serad (1891)
- Corky Valentine (1949)

== See also ==
Rockford Forest City players
Rockford Forest Citys (minor league) players
Rockford Hustlers players
Rockford Red Sox players
Rockford Reds players
Rockford Rough Riders players
Rockford Rox players
Rockford Wakes players
Rockford White Stockings players
Rockford Wolverines players
Rockford Wolves players

== Rockford Rox Year-by-year records ==
| Year | Record | Finish | Manager | Playoffs |
|---|---|---|---|---|
| 1917 | 39–21 | 2nd | Frank Reynolds | season shortened to July 8 |
| 1919 | 63–60 | 4th | John Castle | No playoffs held |
| 1920 | 70–70 | 3rd | Jim Shollenberger / Harry Brant | No playoffs held |
| 1921 | 72–64 | 2nd | Harry Brant | No playoffs held |
| 1922 | 74–65 | 5th | Harry Brant | No playoffs held |
| 1923 | 76–63 | 2nd | Harry Rigsby | No playoffs held |
| 1947 | 68–57 | 3rd | Cyril Pfeifer | lost in 1st round |
| 1948 | 56–72 | 5th | Cyril Pfeifer / Paul O'Dea / Cyril Pfeifer | No playoffs held |
| 1949 | 38–91 | 6th | Robert Dill / Fred Lietz | No playoffs held |
