= Joe Hauser =

American baseball player (1899–1997)

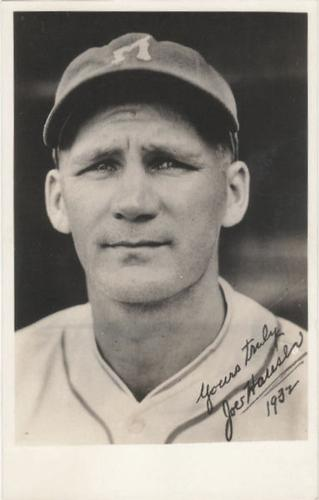
- First baseman
- Born: January 12, 1899; Milwaukee, Wisconsin, U.S.
- Died: July 11, 1997 (aged 98); Sheboygan, Wisconsin, U.S.
- Batted: Left Threw: Left

MLB debut
- April 18, 1922, for the Philadelphia Athletics

Last MLB appearance
- October 6, 1929, for the Cleveland Indians

MLB statistics
- Batting average: .284
- Home runs: 80
- Runs batted in: 356
- Stats at Baseball Reference

Teams
- Philadelphia Athletics (1922–1924, 1926, 1928); Cleveland Indians (1929)

Joseph John Hauser (January 21, 1899 – July 11, 1997), nicknamed "Unser Choe", was an American professional baseball player who was a first baseman in the major leagues from 1922 to 1929, with the Philadelphia Athletics and Cleveland Indians. Hauser's major league career was undistinguished, but he made a name for himself in the minor leagues, where he became the first player ever to hit 60 or more home runs twice in a professional career: 63 in 1930, and 69 in 1933.

== Career ==
=== Minor leagues ===
After being discovered playing semi-pro ball in Waupun, Wisconsin, Hauser was signed to begin with the Providence Grsys of the Eastern League in 1918, and found himself back in his hometown two years later, with the Milwaukee Brewers of the American Association. There, he acquired the nickname "Unser Choe". As he told it, the predominantly German-immigrant fans would support him. If he was having a bad day at the plate and some fans were booing, others would admonish them with, "Das ist unser Choe!" -- German and German-English for "That is our Joe!"

=== Major Leagues ===
He had his best major league year statistically in 1924, but a broken leg and slow recovery hampered his career in 1925 and 1926. In 1928, he seemed to get back on track, but his ability to hit major league pitching somehow vanished, and after 1929, he was through in the majors. He later blamed Oakland Athletics player-coach Ty Cobb for over-analyzing and impairing his hitting style.

In 629 games over 6 seasons in his major league career, Hauser compiled a .284 batting average (580-for-2044) with 351 runs, 80 home runs and 356 RBI. He recorded a .990 fielding percentage.

=== Back to the minor leagues ===
Back in the minors in 1930, Hauser played for the Baltimore Orioles of the International League and regained his hitting touch, slamming a then-professional record of 63 home runs in one season, in the cozy confines of Oriole Park. He also led the minors in homers in 1931.

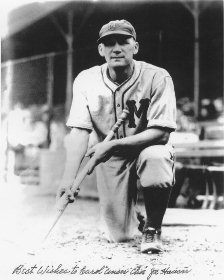
Hauser during his playing career

The Minneapolis Millers of the American Association thought Hauser would be a good addition to the even-cozier Nicollet Park, home of the Millers, and they were right. They bought his contract just before the 1932 season. After a slow start, Hauser hit 49 long ones to lead the Association in home runs. He might have hit more, and challenged the league record of 54 (set by Nick Cullop of the Millers in 1930), but he was rested to allow an injury to heal so that he would be healthy for the Junior World Series.

1933 was Hauser's career year. The league decided to cut its schedule from 168 to 154 games, and Hauser went homer-less in his first nine games, so his prospects for even reaching his previous year's total were in doubt. However, in the home opener, Hauser hit one out in his first at-bat, and then three more the next day, and the long balls began to accumulate. By the end of June, he had reached 32. He hit his 50th on July 27 in Milwaukee. He hit his 54th and 55th in Toledo a couple of weeks later, setting a new league mark. On August 20, he hit his 60th, the first player to hit 60 twice in a professional career. He tied and broke his own professional record by hitting his 63rd and 64th in St. Paul's Lexington Park on Labor Day. He pushed the total to 69, with his chance at 70 rained out. Hauser also collected 182 RBIs and a record-setting 439 total bases.

Hauser got off to a good start in 1934, but a fractured kneecap ended his season, and his career wound down after that. He played off and on for the Millers and then Sheboygan Indians before hanging up his cleats in 1943.

== Legacy ==
Following his playing career, he ran a sporting goods shop in Sheboygan until retiring in 1984.

Hauser's 69 home runs were eventually matched by Bob Crues in 1948 and surpassed by the 72 of Joe Bauman in 1954. He remained the only player to hit 60 or more twice until Mark McGwire and Sammy Sosa accomplished the feat in 1998 and 1999.

== See also ==
- History of baseball in the United States
