= Eddie Stumpf =

- Manager
- Born: May 15, 1894
- Died: October 16, 1978 (aged 84); Milwaukee, Wisconsin, U.S.
- Batted: Unknown Threw: Right

debut
- 1943,, for the Rockford Peaches

Last appearance
- 1945,, for the Kenosha Comets

Career statistics
- 1943 record: 35-56 [4th place]
- 1945 record: 41-69 [6th place]

Career highlights and awards
- 1943 All-Star Game

Edward Stumpf (May 15, 1894 – October 16, 1978) was an American player, manager and executive in Minor league baseball.

Stumpf began his professional baseball career as a catcher in the American Association, playing from 1916 through 1919 for the Milwaukee Brewers and Columbus Senators. After that he coached and scouted for the Brewers for several years, before becoming a manager in 1939 with the Tarboro Serpents in the Class-D Coastal Plain League. From 1941 to 1942, Stumpf managed and eventually caught for the Janesville Cubs of the Wisconsin State League, until he heard about the All-American Girls Professional Baseball League, an innovative circuit conceived by Philip K. Wrigley, a chewing-gum magnate who had inherited the Chicago Cubs Major League Baseball franchise from his father. Stumpf took the opportunity to get news at first hand, because Wrigley was his employer at the time.

The All-American Girls Professional Baseball League play officially began on May 30, 1943 with four teams, the Kenosha Comets, Racine Belles, Rockford Peaches and South Bend Blue Sox. Stumpf became one of the first four managers hired by Wrigley, being assigned to the Rockford club. The other managers selected were Johnny Gottselig (Racine), an experimented ice hockey left winger who played 17 seasons for the Chicago Black Hawks (NHL), and former big leaguers Josh Billings (Kenosha) and Bert Niehoff (South Bend).

After that, Stumpf was an active scout for the league during the rest of the decade and served a second stint as manager in 1945 (Kenosha). He also has been credited with switching Dorothy Kamenshek from outfield to first base after just 12 games for the Peaches. A perennial All-Star and two-time champion bat, Kamenshek was considered by former New York Yankees first baseman Wally Pipp, as the fanciest-fielding first sacker he had ever seen among men or women.

Stumpf later moved into the front offices. He joined the Cleveland Indians organization in 1950, first as business director of Cleveland minor league system and later was promoted as general manager for Triple-A Indianapolis Indians in 1953. While working for the Indians, he provided assistance in the development and monitoring of future big leaguers as Hank Aguirre, Joe Altobelli, Rocky Colavito and Al Smith, among others.

Stumpf was a long resident of Milwaukee, Wisconsin, where he died at the age of 84. He is part of the AAGPBL permanent display at the Baseball Hall of Fame and Museum at Cooperstown, New York opened in 1988, which is dedicated to the entire league rather than any individual player.
