= Fond du Lac Panthers =

- 1940–1953; (1940-1942, 1946-1953); Fond du Lac, Wisconsin

Minor league affiliations
- Previous classes: Class D
- League: Wisconsin State League

Major league affiliations
- Previous teams: New York Yankees (1942, 1946-1952)

The Fond du Lac Panthers were a Wisconsin State League minor league baseball team that played in Fond du Lac, Wisconsin, from 1940 to 1953.

== Notable alumni ==
- Ray Powell (1942)
- Harry Rice (1940–1941)
- Charley Pride (1953)
