= Jack Sheehan (baseball) =

American baseball player (1893-1987)

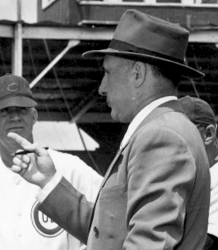
- Sheehan with the Chicago Cubs during spring training in 1947
- Infielder
- Born: April 15, 1893; Chicago, Illinois, U.S.
- Died: May 29, 1987 (aged 94); West Palm Beach, Florida, U.S.
- Batted: Switch Threw: Right

MLB debut
- September 11, 1920, for the Brooklyn Robins

Last MLB appearance
- May 16, 1921, for the Brooklyn Robins

MLB statistics
- Batting average: .118
- Home runs: 0
- Runs batted in: 0
- Stats at Baseball Reference

Teams
- Brooklyn Robins (1920–1921)

John Thomas Sheehan (April 15, 1893 – May 29, 1987) was an American professional baseball player who played infield for the Brooklyn Robins in the 1920 and 1921 baseball seasons. He attended college at Fordham University.

After his playing career, Sheehan worked as the director of the Chicago Cubs farm system.

He later managed in the minor leagues during 1916–1953. After that, he became a scout, serving as Scouting Director for the Washington Senators in the 1960s.
