= Agricultural Society Fair Grounds =

Fairground and baseball field in Rockford, Illinois

Coordinates: 42°16′38″N 89°6′4.4″W

Agricultural Society Fair Grounds was a fairground on the west side of Rockford, Illinois. It served as the grounds for the Winnebago County Agricultural Society. It was used as a baseball grounds by the Rockford Forest Citys baseball club of the National Association during the 1871 season, so it is considered a major league ballpark by those who consider the NA to have been a major league. The Forest Citys had played their home games at the Fair Grounds beginning in 1866, and continued to call it home for the 1871 season.

The Forest Citys had been a strong team during their amateur / semi-professional years, but before the 1871 season began, their star pitcher Al Spalding had signed with the Boston Red Stockings. The Forest Citys played only 6 home games during the 1871 season, and finished in last place in the new league. The rest of their star players, including Cap Anson and Bob Addy, signed with other teams for 1872, and the Rockford Forest Citys disbanded.

Contemporary and historical accounts describe the park during the 1866-1871 period as woefully inadequate for organized baseball, with trees blocking much of foul ground, and third base being uphill from the rest of the diamond.

By the 1890s the property was called Fair Grounds Park and was an occasional home field for Rockford's minor league clubs. The Winnebago County Fair, after some 50 years at this location, temporarily folded in 1903 and the fairgrounds were sold to the city of Rockford. The fair was revived a few years later, moving into rural land. In modern times the old fairgrounds is neither a fairgrounds nor a ballpark, but Fairgrounds Park (as it is now spelled) still exists, as a part of the Rockford Park District.

The original boundaries of the fairgrounds, as shown on contemporary maps, were Oak (now Acorn) Street (north); Pecatonica Street and Cherry Street (northeast); buildings and Horsman Street (east); Mulberry Street (south); and Kent Creek and railroad tracks (west).

The current footprint of the park is somewhat smaller than it originally was, with the boundaries being the Harkins Aquatic Center and Acorn Street (north); Kilburn Avenue, buildings and Horsman Street (east); West Jefferson Street a.k.a. Business US-20 (south); and Mulberry Street, Kent Creek and railroad tracks (west). The street address now 900 West Jefferson.
