= Green Bay Dodgers =

- 1891–1960; (1891–1892, 1902, 1905–1914, 1940–1942, 1946–1953, 1958–1960); Green Bay, Wisconsin

Minor league affiliations
- Previous classes: Class B (1958–1960); Class D (1940–1942, 1946–1953); Class C (1910–1914, 1940–1942); Class D (1905–1909)
- League: Illinois–Indiana–Iowa League (1958–1960)
- Previous leagues: Wisconsin State League (1940–1942, 1946–1953); Wisconsin–Illinois League (1908–1914); Wisconsin State League (1902, 1905–1907); Wisconsin–Michigan League (1892); Wisconsin State League (1891)

Major league affiliations
- Previous teams: Los Angeles Dodgers (1958–1960); Cleveland Indians (1947–1953); Philadelphia Phillies (1946)

Minor league titles
- League titles: 3 (1946, 1953, 1959)

Team data
- Previous names: Green Bay Dodgers (1960); Green Bay Bluejays (1942, 1946–1953, 1958–1959); Green Bay Blue Sox (1941); Green Bay Bluejays (1940); Green Bay Bays (1909–1914); Green Bay Tigers (1908); Green Bay Orphans (1907); Green Bay Colts (1905–1906); Green Bay (1902); Green Bay Bays (1892); Green Bay (1891)
- Previous parks: Joannes Stadium (1940-1960)

The Green Bay Dodgers were the final moniker of the minor league baseball teams located in Green Bay, Wisconsin, United States between 1891 and 1960. Green Bay teams played as members of the Wisconsin State League (1891), Wisconsin–Michigan League (1892), Wisconsin State League (1902, 1905–1907), Wisconsin–Illinois League (1908–1914), Wisconsin State League (1940–1942, 1946–1953 and Illinois–Indiana–Iowa League (1958–1960) .

Green Bay was an affiliate of the Philadelphia Phillies in 1946, Cleveland Indians from 1947 to 1953 and Los Angeles Dodgers from 1958 to 1960.

== History ==
Affiliated with the Los Angeles Dodgers, the Bluejays won the league title in 1959. The name was changed to the Green Bay Dodgers for the 1960 season. The team folded after the season.

The earlier Green Bay Bluejays were members of the Wisconsin State League (1940–1942, 1946–1953) and were affiliated with the Cleveland Indians (1947–1953) and Philadelphia Phillies (1946). Previous Green Bay teams were the Green Bay Bays (1909–1914), Green Bay Tigers (1908), Green Bay Orphans (1907), Green Bay Colts (1905–1906), Green Bay Bays (1902), (1892), and Green Bay Dock Wallopers (1891). They were members of the Wisconsin–Illinois League (1908–1914), Wisconsin State League (1902, 1905–1907), Wisconsin–Michigan League (1892) and the Wisconsin State League (1891).

== The ballpark ==
The Dodgers and Bluejays played at Joannes Stadium beginning in 1940. Joannes Stadium is still in use as a ballpark. the ballpark is located at Baird Street and Walnut Street in Green Bay, Wisconsin.

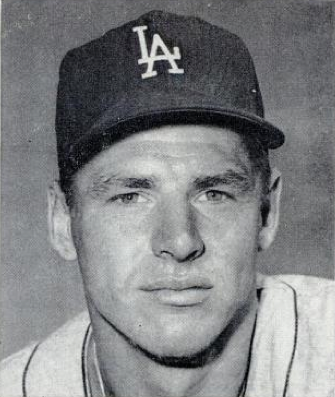
Frank Howard, Dodgers, 1962

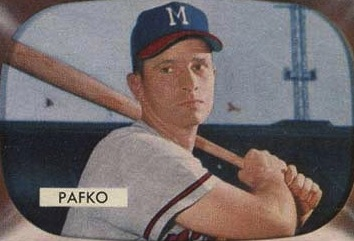
Andy Pafko, Bowman Card, 1955

== Notable players ==
- Phil Ortega (1960)
- Doug Camilli (1959)
- Willie Davis (1959) 2x MLB All-Star
- Tim Harkness (1959)
- Nate Oliver (1959)
- Pete Richert (1959) 2x MLB All-Star
- Frank Howard (1958) 4× MLB All-Star; 1960 NL Rookie of the Year
- Ed Rakow (1958)
- Pete Reiser (1958, MGR) 3× MLB All-Star;
- Earl Robinson (1958)
- Dick Brown (1953)
- Russ Nixon (1953) MLB MGR
- Phil Seghi (1949–53, MGR) MLB Executive/Scout: Signed Pete Rose
- Billy Moran (1952) MLB All-Star
- Jim Delsing (1942)
- George Binks (1941)
- Andy Pafko (1941) 5x MLB All-Star
