= Madison Blues (baseball) =

- 1923–1942; Madison, Wisconsin

Minor league affiliations
- Class: Class B
- League: Wisconsin-Illinois League (1926-1927, 1932-1933); Wisconsin State League (1928-31, 1934-37); Tri-State League (1938-39); Three-I League (1940-42)

Major league affiliations
- Team: Chicago Cubs (1942)

Team data
- Name: Madison Blues
- Ballpark: Kipp Field; Breese Stevens Field

The Madison Blues was a semi-professional minor league baseball team in Madison, Wisconsin, from 1923 to 1942. Launched by the Madison Athletic Association and captained by manager Eddie Lenahan, the Blues began independent of any league. They played their home games at Kipp Field for their first three years before moving to the newly built Breese Stevens Field in 1926. They joined the Wisconsin-Illinois league in that year, and went on to play in the Wisconsin State League, the Tri-State League and Three-I League in later years. The Blues final season was in 1942, when the demands for men to serve in World War II ended many other minor league franchises throughout the country.

== Notable alumni ==
- Dave Koslo (1940) 1949 NL ERA Title
- Johnny Schmitz (1940) 2 x MLB All-Star
