= George Flynn (baseball) =

American baseball player (1871–1901)

- Outfielder
- Born: May 24, 1871; Chicago, Illinois, U.S.
- Died: December 28, 1901 (aged 30); Chicago, Illinois, U.S.
- Batted: Unknown Threw: Unknown

MLB debut
- April 17, 1896, for the Chicago Colts

Last MLB appearance
- May 23, 1896, for the Chicago Colts

MLB statistics
- Batting average: .255
- Home runs: 0
- Runs batted in: 4
- Stats at Baseball Reference

Teams
- Chicago Colts (1896)

George Albert Flynn (May 24, 1871 – December 28, 1901) was an American professional baseball player who was an outfielder in the Major Leagues in 1896. He would play for the Chicago Colts.
