= Tom Letcher =

American baseball player

- Outfielder
- Born: January 1868; Bryan, Ohio, U.S.
- Died: Unknown
- Batted: Left Threw: Unknown

MLB debut
- September 27, 1891, for the Milwaukee Brewers

Last MLB appearance
- October 4, 1891, for the Milwaukee Brewers

MLB statistics
- Batting average: .190
- Home runs: 0
- Runs batted in: 2
- Stats at Baseball Reference

Teams
- Milwaukee Brewers (1891)

Frederick Thomas Letcher (born January 1868) was an American Major League Baseball outfielder. He played in six games for the 1891 Milwaukee Brewers of the American Association. He had an extensive minor league career that lasted from 1890 through 1911 and included two seasons as player/manager in 1908 and 1910.

== Sources ==
- Career statistics from Baseball Reference · Baseball Reference (Minors) · Retrosheet · Baseball Almanac
