= Sheboygan Indians =

- 1940–1953; (1923–1932, 1934–1937, 1940–1942, 1946–1953); Sheboygan, Wisconsin

Minor league affiliations
- Previous classes: Class D (1940–1942, 1946–1953); Independent (1923–1932)
- League: Wisconsin State League (1923–1932, 1934–1937, 1940–1942, 1946–1953)

Major league affiliations
- Previous teams: Brooklyn Dodgers (1948–1953)

Minor league titles
- League titles: 10 1923, 1926, 1927, 1931, 1937, 1942, 1947, 1948, 1951, 1952
- Conference titles: 1935

Team data
- Previous names: Sheboygan Chairmakers (1923–1932, 1934–1937); Sheboygan Indians (1940–1942, 1946–1953)
- Previous parks: Memorial Park

The Sheboygan Indians was the primary moniker of the minor-league baseball team based in Sheboygan, Wisconsin. Sheboygan teams played in the Wisconsin State League (1923–1932, 1934–1937 1940–1942, 1946–1953). The Sheboygan Indians were an affiliate of the Brooklyn Dodgers (1948–1953). Sheboygan teams won ten Wisconsin State League Championships.

== History ==
The Sheboygan Indians operated from 1940–1942 and 1946–1953 as members of the Class D Wisconsin State League. The Indians were preceded by the Sheboygan Chairmakers, who played in the Independent Wisconsin State League from 1923–1932 and 1934–1937. Joe Hauser was the manager of the Indians for their duration. Hauser, incidentally, had been a major-league first baseman in the 1920s primarily with the Philadelphia Athletics. In 1924, he hit 27 home runs to finish second in the American League to Babe Ruth. Hauser began his career with the Sheboygan Indians as a player/manager and then a full-time manager.

The Sheboygan Chairmakers captured the Wisconsin State League championship in 1923, 1926, 1927, 1931 and 1937 under Manager Paul Beyers. The Sheboygan Indians won the 1942, 1947, 1948, 1951 and 1952 Wisconsin State League championships under Joe Hauser.

== The ballpark ==
The Indians played their games at Memorial Park, later to be renamed Legion Park, on Sheboygan's north side. The park was torn down in 1979. The park's large green grandstand could hold close to 3,000 fans, and several thousand more could be accommodated in bleachers the team used periodically during its existence. A park-record 9,000 fans watched an exhibition game between the Chicago Cubs and Cincinnati Reds in 1933. The Cubs won 21-11.

== Notable alumni ==
- Joe Hauser (1940–1942, 1946–1953, MGR)
- Walt Moryn MLB All-Star
- John Roseboro (1952) 6 x MLB All-Star
- Dick Tracewski (1953)
