= Oshkosh Giants =

- 1886–1953; (1886–1887, 1891–1892, 1902, 1905–1914, 1941–1942, 1946–1953); Oshkosh, Wisconsin

Minor league affiliations
- Previous classes: Class D (1941–1942, 1946–1953); Class C (1910–1914); Class D (1905–1909)
- Previous leagues: Wisconsin State League (1941–1942, 1946–1953); Wisconsin–Illinois League (1908–1914); Wisconsin State League (1902, 1905–1907); Wisconsin–Michigan League (1892); Wisconsin State League (1891); Northwestern League (1886–1887)

Major league affiliations
- Previous teams: New York Giants (1942, 1946–1953)

Minor league titles
- League titles: 1949, 1950

Team data
- Previous names: Oshkosh Giants (1941–1942, 1946–1953); Oshkosh Indians (1905–1914); Oshkosh (1902); Oshkosh Indians (1892); Oshkosh (1886–1887, 1891)
- Previous parks: Sawyer Avenue Ballpark

The Oshkosh Giants were a minor league baseball team based in Oshkosh, Wisconsin that played between 1941 and 1953 in the Wisconsin State League.

== Notable alumni ==
- Hank Bauer (1941) 3 x MLB All-Star
- Dave Garcia (1949-1950, MGR)
- Fred Schulte (1941-1942, MGR)
- Bob Schmidt (1952) MLB All-Star
