= Wisconsin State League =

Former baseball minor leagues

- Classification: Independent; Class D
- Sport: Minor League Baseball
- First season: 1891
- Folded: 1953
- Replaced by: Wisconsin–Michigan League; Wisconsin–Illinois League
- President: Thomas Ahern (1891); Hon. A.E. Mountain (1891); John T. Powers (1905–1906); Charles F. Moll (1907); Herman D. White (1940–1942, 1946–1947); Judge Arnold F. Murphy (1948–1951); Dan G.Cisco (1952); Duane F. Bowman (1953)
- No. of teams: 29
- Country: United States of America
- Most titles: 6 Madison Blues
- Related competitions: Wisconsin–Michigan League

The Wisconsin State League was a class D level baseball league that began in 1905, changing its name to the Wisconsin–Illinois League in 1908 and operating through 1914. The league re–organized under that name in 1926. Another Wisconsin State League began in 1940, shut down during World War II from 1943 through 1945, then operated from 1946 through 1953.

The Class D Wisconsin–Illinois League began play in 1940 with six charter franchises: Appleton Papermakers, Fond du Lac Panthers, Green Bay Bluejays, La Crosse Blackhawks, Sheboygan Indians and Wisconsin Rapids White Sox. In 1942 the league expanded to eight teams, adding the Janesville Cubs and Oshkosh Giants. After play resumed in 1946, La Crosse moved to become the Wausau Lumberjacks and the league operated with those franchises until its demise following the 1953 season.

== List of teams ==
Wisconsin State League (1905–1907, 1922–1925, 1928–1931, 1940–1942, 1946–1953)
Wisconsin–Illinois League (1908–1914, 1926–1927, 1932)

- Appleton, WI: Appleton Papermakers (1891, 1909–1914, 1940–1942, 1946–1953)
- Aurora, IL: Aurora Islanders (1910)
- Beloit, WI: Beloit Collegians (1905); Beloit Fairies (1926–1927)
- Chicago, IL: Logan Squares (1926–1927, 1932); Niesen's Chicago Pyotts (1926); St. Michael's (1926); Duffy Florals (1932); Harley Mills (1932)
- Eau Claire, WI: Eau Claire-Chippewa Falls Orphans (1906); Eau Claire Tigers (1907)
- Fond du Lac, WI: Fond du Lac Mudhens (1891); Fond du Lac Webfoots (1907); Fond du Lac Cubs (1908); Fond du Lac Giants (1909–1910); Fond du Lac Molls (1913); Fond du Lac Mudhens (1911); Fond du Lac Panthers (1940–1942, 1946–1953)
- Freeport, IL: Freeport Pretzels (1905–1909)
- Green Bay, WI: Green Bay Dock Wallopers (1891); Green Bay Colts (1905–1906); Green Bay Orphans (1907); Green Bay Tigers (1908); Green Bay Bays (1909–1914); Green Bay Blue Sox (1941); Green Bay Bluejays (1940, 1942, 1946–1953)
- Janesville, WI: Janesville Cubs (1941–1942, 1947–1953); Janesville Bears (1946)
- Kenosha, WI: Kenosha Twin Sixes (1926–1929)
- La Crosse, WI: La Crosse Pinks (1905–1906, 1908); La Crosse Badgers (1907); La Crosse Boosters (1926); La Crosse Blackhawks (1940–1942)
- Madison, WI: Madison Senators (1905–1914); Madison Blues (1928–1932)
- Manitowoc, WI: Manitowoc Shipbuilders (1928–1931)
- Marinette, WI: Marinette Badgers (1891); Marinette-Menominee Twins (1914)
- Milwaukee, WI: Milwaukee Creams (1913); Kosciuszko Reds (1928–1930);Onion Oils/Union Oils (1928); Milwaukee Red Sox (1931–1932)
- Oconto, WI: Oconto Log Drivers (1891)
- Oshkosh, WI: Oshkosh Indians (1905–1914); Oshkosh Giants 1941–1942, 1946–1953)
- Racine, WI: Racine Malted Milks (1909–1911, 1914); Racine Belles (1909–1915); Racine Eskimos (1926); Racine Belles (1929–1930)
- Rockford, IL: Rockford Reds (1908–1910); Rockford Wolverines (1911–1913); Rockford Wolves (1914)
- Sheboygan, WI: Sheboygan Chairmakers (1926–1932); Sheboygan Indians (1940–1942, 1946–1953)
- Two Rivers, WI: Two Rivers Mirrors (1928–1931)
- Wausau, WI: Wausau Lumberjacks (1905–1908, 1912–1914, 1946–1953)
- Wisconsin Rapids, WI: Wisconsin Rapids White Sox (1940–1942, 1946–1953)

== Season standings ==
=== 1891 to 1892 ===
1891 Wisconsin State League

Team name	W	L	PCT	GB	Managers
Marinette Lumber Shovers	51	39	.567	-	Jacob Aydelotte
Appleton Papermakers	48	41	.539	2½	Charles Faatz
Green Bay Dock Wallopers	48	42	.533	3	Thomas Murray / George Brackett
Oshkosh Indians	46	44	.511	5	John Roushkolb / Daniel Sweeney
Fond du Lac Mudhens	41	49	.456	10	Bob Berryhill
Oconto Log Drivers	35	54	.393	15½	John Guehrer

1905 Wisconsin State League

Team name	W	L	PCT	GB	Managers
La Crosse Pinks	68	41	.624	-	Pink Hawley
Oshkosh Indians	60	47	.561	7	Morey Crall / John Lavie
Freeport Pretzels	54	56	.491	14½	Nick Malvern / Bill Moriarty
Beloit Collegians	50	59	.459	18	George Wilbur / George Bubser
Wausau Lumberjacks	47	61	.435	20½	Jack Corbett; John Mott / Nick Malvern
Green Bay Colts	47	62	.431	21	W. Kennelly / William McGinnis; Marty McQuade / Ernest Van Erman / Warren Beckwith

1906 Wisconsin State League
schedule

Team name	W	L	PCT	GB	Managers
La Crosse Pinks	76	42	.644	-	Pink Hawley
Freeport Pretzels	73	43	.629	2	Bill Moriarty
Oshkosh Indians	56	63	.471	20½	Charlie Hanford
Green Bay Colts	55	63	.466	21	George Bubser / Phil Stremmel
Wausau Lumberjacks	48	70	.407	28	Nick Malvern / Belanger
Eau Claire-Chippewa Falls Orphans	44	71	.383	30½	Andy Porter / Al Tebeau; Rasmussen / Nick Malvern

La Crosse played Freeport on the last day of the season with the pennant in balance. 5,000 fans saw a 0–0 game after nine innings. La Crosse pushed across five runs in the tenth to win.

=== 1907 to 1914 ===
1907 Wisconsin State League
schedule

Team name	W	L	PCT	GB	Managers
Freeport Pretzels	79	41	.658	-	Tom Schoonhaven
Wausau Lumberjacks	76	43	.639	2½	Charlie Ferguson
La Crosse Badgers	67	50	.528	10½	Pink Hawley
Eau Claire Tigers	62	56	.525	16	Bobby Lynch
Oshkosh Indians	58	65	.472	21½	George Bubser
Madison Senators	52	66	.441	26	Howard Cassibone
Green Bay Orphans	48	73	.397	31½	John Corrigan
Fond du Lac Webfoots	34	82	.293	43	Tom Fletcher

1908 season (W-I League)

Team	Wins	Losses	Pct.	Games played
Wausau Lumberjacks	72	47	.605	119
La Crosse Pinks	66	57	.537	123
Madison Senators	64	56	.533	120
Green Bay Tigers	65	58	.528	123
Freeport Pretzels	59	62	.488	121
Fond du Lac Cubs	57	65	.467	122
Oshkosh Indians	54	66	.450	120
Rockford Reds	48	74	.393	122

1909 season (W-I League)

Team	Wins	Losses	Pct.	Games played
Madison Senators	74	45	.622	119
Green Bay Bays	69	54	.561	123
Racine Malted Milks	66	58	.532	124
Appleton Papermakers	66	58	.532	124
Rockford Reds	61	61	.500	122
Fond du Lac Giants	58	64	.475	122
Oshkosh Indians	52	72	.419	124
Freeport Pretzels	45	79	.363	124

1910 season (W-I League)

Team	Wins	Losses	Pct.	Games played
Appleton Papermakers	74	46	.617	120
Rockford Reds	72	50	.590	122
Fond du Lac Giants	66	55	.545	121
Madison Senators	62	59	.512	121
Green Bay Bays	59	61	.492	120
Racine Malted Milks	59	62	.488	121
Oshkosh Indians	51	72	.415	123
Aurora Islanders	43	81	.347	124

1911 season (W-I League)

Team	Wins	Losses	Pct.	Games played
Rockford	74	46	.617	120
Madison Senators	65	57	.533	122
Green Bay Bays	61	56	.521	117
Appleton Papermakers	63	58	.521	121
Oshkosh Indians	61	64	.488	125
Racine Malted Milks	58	64	.475	122
Aurora Blues	55	65	.458	120
Fond du Lac	47	73	.392	120

1912 season (W-I League)

Team	Wins	Losses	Pct.	Games played
Oshkosh Indians	87	45	.659	132
Racine Belles	78	51	.605	129
Appleton	67	60	.528	127
Wausau	66	76	.465	142
Green Bay Bays	61	68	.473	129
Rockford	63	71	.470	134
Aurora	54	80	.403	134
Madison Senators	51	85	.375	136

1913 season (W-I League)

Team	Wins	Losses	Pct.	Games played
Oshkosh Indians	74	46	.617	120
Racine Belles	72	51	.585	123
Green Bay Bays	69	57	.548	126
Rockford	65	56	.537	121
Madison Senators	64	61	.512	125
Fond du Lac	63	61	.508	124
Wausau Lumberjacks	45	80	.360	125
Appleton Papermakers	43	80	.350	123

1914 season (W-I League)

Team	Wins	Losses	Pct.	Games played
Oshkosh Indians	75	43	.636	118
Green Bay Bays	73	51	.589	124
Appleton Papermakers	64	55	.538	119
Racine Malted Milks	64	58	.525	122
Twin Cities (Prairie du Sac/Sauk City)	61	59	.508	120
Madison Senators	57	62	.479	119
Rockford Wolves	48	71	.403	119
Wausau Lumberjacks	39	82	.322	121

=== 1922 to 1937 ===
1922 season (Wis. State League)

Team	Wins	Losses	Pct.	Games played
Manitowoc	8	3	.727	11
Green Bay	7	4	.636	11
Menasha	6	6	.500	12
Appleton	2	10	.167	12

1923 season (Wis. State League)

Team	Wins	Losses	Pct.	Games played
Sheboygan Chairmakers	19	9	.679	28
Neenah-Menasha Papermakers	19	9	.679	28
Appleton	17	11	.607	28
Green Bay Bays	15	13	.536	28
Kaukauna	14	14	.500	28
Marinette-Menominee Twins	10	18	.357	28
Oshkosh	10	18	.357	28
Fond du Lac	8	20	.286	28

1924 season (Wis. State League)

Team	Wins	Losses	Pct.	Games played
Neenah-Menasha	8	2	.800	10
Green Bay	5	5	.500	10
Appleton	4	4	.500	8
Sheboygan	4	4	.500	8
Oshkosh	3	4	.429	8
Fond du Lac	2	6	.250	8

1925 season (Wis. State League)

Team	Wins	Losses	Pct.	Games played
Kenosha Twin Sixes	33	17	.660	50
Beloit Fairies	24	21	.533	45
Racine Athletics	24	28	.462	52
Sheboygan Chairmakers	22	29	.431	51

1926 season (W-I League)

Team	Wins	Losses	Pct.	Games played
Sheboygan Chairmakers	48	21	.696	69
Kenosha Twin Sixes	44	28	.611	72
Beloit Fairies	32	22	.593	54
Madison Blues	27	31	.466	58
Racine Belles	30	38	.441	68
Logan Squares (Chicago)	12	21	.364	33
La Crosse Boosters	9	25	.265	34

1927 season (W-I League)

Team	Wins	Losses	Pct.	Games played
Sheboygan Chairmakers	33	17	.660	50
Beloit Fairies	17	17	.500	34
Madison Blues	18	28	.391	46
Kenosha Twin Sixers	13	28	.317	41
Logan Squares (Chicago)	13	4	.765	17

1928 season (Wis. State League)

Team	Wins	Losses	Pct.	Games played
Two Rivers Mirros	20	13	.606	33
Sheboygan Chairmakers	19	15	.559	34
Kosciuszko Reds (Milwaukee)	17	15	.531	32
Union Oils (Milwaukee)	16	16	.500	32
Manitowoc Shipbuilders	14	19	.424	33
Madison Blues	12	20	.375	32

1929 season (Wis. State League)

Team	Wins	Losses	Pct.	Games played
Two Rivers Mirros	19	6	.760	25
Sheboygan Chairmakers	18	7	.720	25
Union Oils (Milwaukee)	12	12	.500	24
Manitowoc Shipbuilders	13	13	.500	26
Kenosha Twin Sixes	12	14	.462	26
Racine Belles	11	15	.423	26
Madison Blues	8	17	.320	25
Kosciuszko Reds (Milwaukee)	8	17	.320	25

1930 season (Wis. State League)

Team	Wins	Losses	Pct.	Games played
Racine Belles	18	6	.750	24
Two Rivers Mirros	15	9	.625	24
Madison Blues	13	12	.520	25
Manitowoc Shipbuilders	11	13	.458	24
Sheboygan Chairmakers	11	14	.440	25
Milwaukee Oils	9	12	.429	24
Kosciuszko Reds (Milwaukee)	9	14	.391	23
Kenosha Twin Sixes	8	14	.364	22

1931 season (Wis. State League)

Team	Wins	Losses	Pct.	Games played
Sheboygan Chairmakers	15	4	.789	19
Two Rivers Mirros	10	8	.555	18
Madison Blues	11	9	.550	20
Milwaukee	8	10	.444	18
Racine Belles	3	16	.158	19

1932 season (W-I League)

Team	Wins	Losses	Pct.	Games played
Harley Mills (Chicago)	16	5	.762	21
Madison Blues	21	10	.677	31
Sheboygan Chairmakers	13	11	.542	24
Duffy Florals (Chicago)	14	12	.538	26
Chicago Firemen	7	10	.474	17
Milwaukee Red Sox	11	14	.440	25
Logan Squares (Chicago)	9	12	.429	21
Colored All-Stars	3	15	.167	18
Colored Giants	2	9	.182	11

1933 season (W-I League)

Team	Wins	Losses	Pct.	Games played
Madison Blues	34	17	.667	51
Harley Mills	18	10	.655	28
Duffy Florals	18	14	.563	32
Logan Squares	17	18	.486	35
Aurora	8	9	.471	17
Spencer Coals	7	12	.368	19
Chicago Firemen	6	15	.286	21
Colored All-Stars	4	16	.200	20

1934 season (Wis. State League) |+First half of the split season:

Team	Wins	Losses	Pct.	Games played
Green Bay Green Sox	7	1	.875	8
Kaukauna	5	3	.625	8
Madison Blues	4	3	.571	7
Wisconsin Rapids	3	5	.375	8
Sheboygan Chairmakers	8	9	.471	17
Oshkosh Indians	7	12	.368	19

|+Second half of the split season:

Team	Wins	Losses	Pct.	Games played
Madison Blues	8	2	.800	10
Wisconsin Rapids	8	2	.800	10
Green Bay Green Sox	4	5	.444	9
Sheboygan Chairmakers	4	5	.444	9
Oshkosh Indians	3	7	.300	10
Kaukauna	2	8	.200	10

The Madison Blues won the tie-breaker from Wisconsin Rapids to meet Green Bay, the winner of the season's first half. Green Bay prevailed in the final three-game championship series.

1935 season (Wis. State League) |+First half of the split season:

Team	Wins	Losses	Pct.	Games played
Madison Blues	8	2	.800	10
Sheboygan Chairmakers	8	2	.800	10
Green Bay Green Sox	5	5	.500	10
Wisconsin Rapids	5	5	.500	10
Kaukauna	3	7	.300	10
Oshkosh Indians	1	9	.100	10

After tying for title of the season's first half, Madison won the first two of a three-game championship series over Sheboygan.

|+Second half of the split season:

Team	Wins	Losses	Pct.	Games played
Sheboygan Chairmakers	6	4	.600	10
Madison Blues	6	4	.600	10
Wisconsin Rapids	6	4	.600	10
Kaukauna	6	4	.600	10
Green Bay Green Sox	3	7	.300	10
Oshkosh Indians	3	7	.300	10

Sheboygan won the run-off for title of the season's second half, but were defeated by first half champs Madison after the Blues won the first two of the three-game title series.

1936 season (Wis. State League) |+First half of the split season:

Team	Wins	Losses	Pct.	Games played
Madison Blues	9	2	.818	11
Racine Belles	7	4	.636	11
Sheboygan Chairmakers	4	6	.400	10
Milwaukee Red Sox	1	9	.100	10

Madison defeated Racine to win the title of the season's first half.

|+Second half of the split season:

Team	Wins	Losses	Pct.	Games played
Madison Blues	8	1	.889	9
Racine Belles	3	4	.429	7
Milwaukee Red Sox	2	3	.400	10
Sheboygan Chairmakers	2	7	.222	9

Madison clinched the title of the season's latter half on Aug. 23 when they defeated the Racine Belles. The Blues became 1936 State League champions by winning both halves of the split season.

1937 season (Wis. State League) |+First half of the split season:

Team	Wins	Losses	Pct.	Games played
Madison Blues	10	2	.833	12
Sheboygan Chairmakers	10	2	.833	12
Racine Belles	3	9	.250	12
Kenosha Unions	1	11	.083	12

Madison defeated Sheboygan in a three-game series to win the title of the season's first half.

|+Second half of the split season:

Team	Wins	Losses	Pct.	Games played
Madison Blues	10	2	.833	12
Sheboygan Chairmakers	10	2	.833	12
Racine Belles	1	9	.100	10
Kenosha Unions	1	9	.100	10

Sheboygan won the three-game tie-breaker series against Madison to win title of the season's latter half. Facing Sheboygan again for the 1937 championship, Blues manager Eddie Lenahan insisted on a single deciding game instead of three. The State League disagreed, declaring that Madison had forfeited the season by refusing to play in a three-game series. The Chairmakers were awarded the 1937 season championship.
