= Sam LaRocque =

Canadian baseball player (1863–1933)

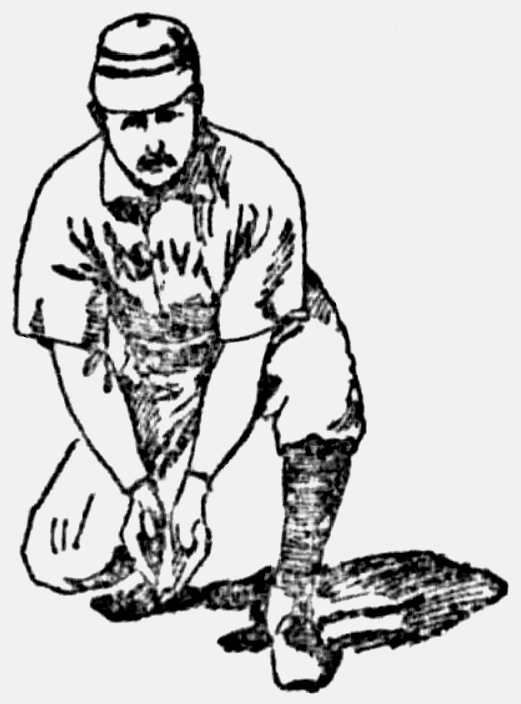
- An 1893 illustration of LaRocque
- Second baseman
- Born: February 26, 1863; Saint-Mathias-sur-Richelieu, Canada East
- Died: May 31, 1933 (aged 70); Highland Park, Michigan, U.S.
- Batted: Right Threw: Right

MLB debut
- July 30, 1888, for the Detroit Wolverines

Last MLB appearance
- May 31, 1891, for the Louisville Colonels

MLB statistics
- Batting average: .249
- Home runs: 2
- Runs batted in: 50
- Stats at Baseball Reference

Teams
- Detroit Wolverines (1888); Pittsburgh Alleghenys/Pirates (1890–1891); Louisville Colonels (1891)

Simeon Henry Jean LaRocque (February 26, 1863 – May 31, 1933) was a Canadian born professional baseball player. He was a second baseman over parts of three seasons (1888, 1890–91) with the Detroit Wolverines, Pittsburgh Alleghenys/Pirates and Louisville Colonels. For his career, he compiled a .249 batting average, with two home runs and 50 runs batted in.

He was born in Saint-Mathias-sur-Richelieu, Quebec and later died in Highland Park, Michigan at the age of 70.
