= Madison Senators =

- 1907–1914; Madison, Wisconsin

Minor league affiliations
- Previous classes: Class C (1909-1914); Class D (1907-1909)
- Previous leagues: Wisconsin-Illinois League (1908-1914); Wisconsin State League (1907)

The Madison Senators were a minor league baseball team based in Madison, Wisconsin that played between 1907 and 1914 in the Wisconsin-Illinois League.
