= Appleton Papermakers =

- 1909–1953; (1909-1914, 1940-1942, 1946-1953); Appleton, Wisconsin

Minor league affiliations
- Previous classes: Class D (1940-1942, 1946-1953); Class C (1910-1914); Class D (1909)
- League: Wisconsin State League (1940–1942, 1946–1953)
- Previous leagues: Wisconsin–Illinois League (1909–1914)

Major league affiliations
- Previous teams: Milwaukee Braves (1953); Boston Braves (1952); St. Louis Browns (1950–1951); Philadelphia Phillies (1947–1949); Cleveland Indians (1941–1942, 1946)

Minor league titles
- League titles: 1 (1910)

Team data
- Previous parks: Goodland Field

The Appleton Papermakers were a minor league baseball team located in Appleton, Wisconsin. They were part of the Wisconsin-Illinois League from 1909–1914 and was in the Wisconsin State League from 1940–1942 and 1946–1953. The team was coached by Dutch Zwilling during part of the 1942 season.

== Notable alumni ==
Hall of Fame alumni

- Travis Jackson (1952-1953, manager); inducted 1982

Notable alumni

- Mike Garcia (1942) 3 x MLB All-Star; 2 x AL ERA Title (1949, 1954)
- Billy Klaus (1946)
- Pat Seerey (1941)
- Joe Tipton (1941)
