= Fond du Lac Mudhens =

- 1891–1911; (1891, 1902, 1907-1911); Fond du Lac, Wisconsin

Minor league affiliations
- Previous classes: Class C (1910-1911); Class D (1907-1909)
- League: Wisconsin-Illinois League (1908-1911)
- Previous leagues: Wisconsin State League (1891, 1902, 1907)

Team data
- Previous names: Fond du Lac Mudhens (1911); Fond du Lac Giants (1909-1910); Fond du Lac Cubs (1908); Fond du Lac Webfoots (1907); Fond du Lac (1891, 1902)

The Fond du Lac Mudhens were the latest name of a minor league baseball team based in Fond du Lac, Wisconsin that played in the Wisconsin State League between 1891 and 1911.
