= Sault Ste. Marie Soos =

- 1905; Sault Ste. Marie, Michigan

Minor league affiliations
- Class: Class D (1905)
- League: Copper Country Soo League (1905)

Major league affiliations
- Team: None

Minor league titles
- League titles (0): None

Team data
- Name: Sault Ste. Marie Soos (1905)
- Ballpark: Brady Park (1905)

The Sault Ste. Marie Soos were a minor league baseball team based in Sault Ste. Marie, Michigan. In 1905, Sault Ste. Marie played as members of the Copper Country Soo League, hosting minor league home games at Brady Park. The 1905 minor league Soos team was preceded by an integrated 1904 independent team.

== History ==
In 1904, Sault Ste. Marie, Michigan hosted an independent professional baseball team. Reportedly, former Negro leagues (Hot Springs Arlingtons) player Julian Ware was a player and coach on the 1904 Sault Ste. Marie Soos, integrating the team. Ware had played baseball at the University of Wisconsin, where he was the team captain in 1903. Ware worked for the Edison Sault Electric Company in Sault Ste. Marie before becoming a M.D. It was noted Eddie Cicotte (Black Sox scandal) and Donie Bush joined Ware on the 1904 Sault Ste. Marie team, which was managed by F.A. Durham. Cicotte was noted to have had a record of 38–4 pitching for Sault Ste. Marie in 1904.

Sault Ste. Marie began classified minor league play in 1905. The Sault Ste. Marie "Soos" played as members of the four–team Class D level Copper Country Soo League. The Calumet Aristocrats, Hancock Infants and Lake Linden Lakers teams joined Sault Ste. Marie in league play. Julian Ware was invited to rejoin the 1905 Soos but was unable to play due to his job at the Edison Sault Electric Company in Sault Ste. Marie.

The use of the "Soo" name by both the Copper Country Soo League and the Sault Ste. Marie Soos team corresponded with the four league teams being mining towns being located along the route of the Soo Line Railroad. The "Soo" name derived from the phonetic pronouncement of "Sault."

Beginning league play on May 17, 1905, the Sault Ste. Marie Soos finished last in their one season of play and folded just before the end of the season. Playing under manager W.B. Earle, the Soos finished with a final record of 29–55 to place fourth in the Copper Country Soo League. In the overall final standings, the Calumet Aristocrats finished the season with a record of 61–36 to win the pennant. The Aristocrats finished 2.0 games ahead of the second place Lake Linden Lakers (61–36) and ahead of the third place Hancock Infants (38–58) and fourth place Sault Ste. Marie in the final regular season standings. In the league playoff, Lake Linden swept Calumet in four games and won the championship.

On July 23, 1905, Soos player Fred Curtis was signed by the New York Highlanders and made his major league debut the next day.

It was noted the Copper Country Soo League struggled with attendance and attempted to merge with the Northern League during the season. With the merger attempt proving unsuccessful, in an attempt to improve attendance, the league moved starting times for games to 6:30 P.M. in order to draw mine workers, whose shifts ended at 6:30. In the era before stadium lighting, reportedly, few games were called because of darkness. It was noted that while the move helped three league teams improve attendance, the Sault Ste. Marie Soos still failed to increase attendance and the franchise disbanded on August 22, 1905. The regular season concluded on September 7, 1905.

The Copper County league permanently folded by name after the 1905 season, evolving into the Northern-Copper Country League in 1906, without a Sault Ste. Marie team. Sault Ste. Marie, Michigan has not hosted another minor league team.

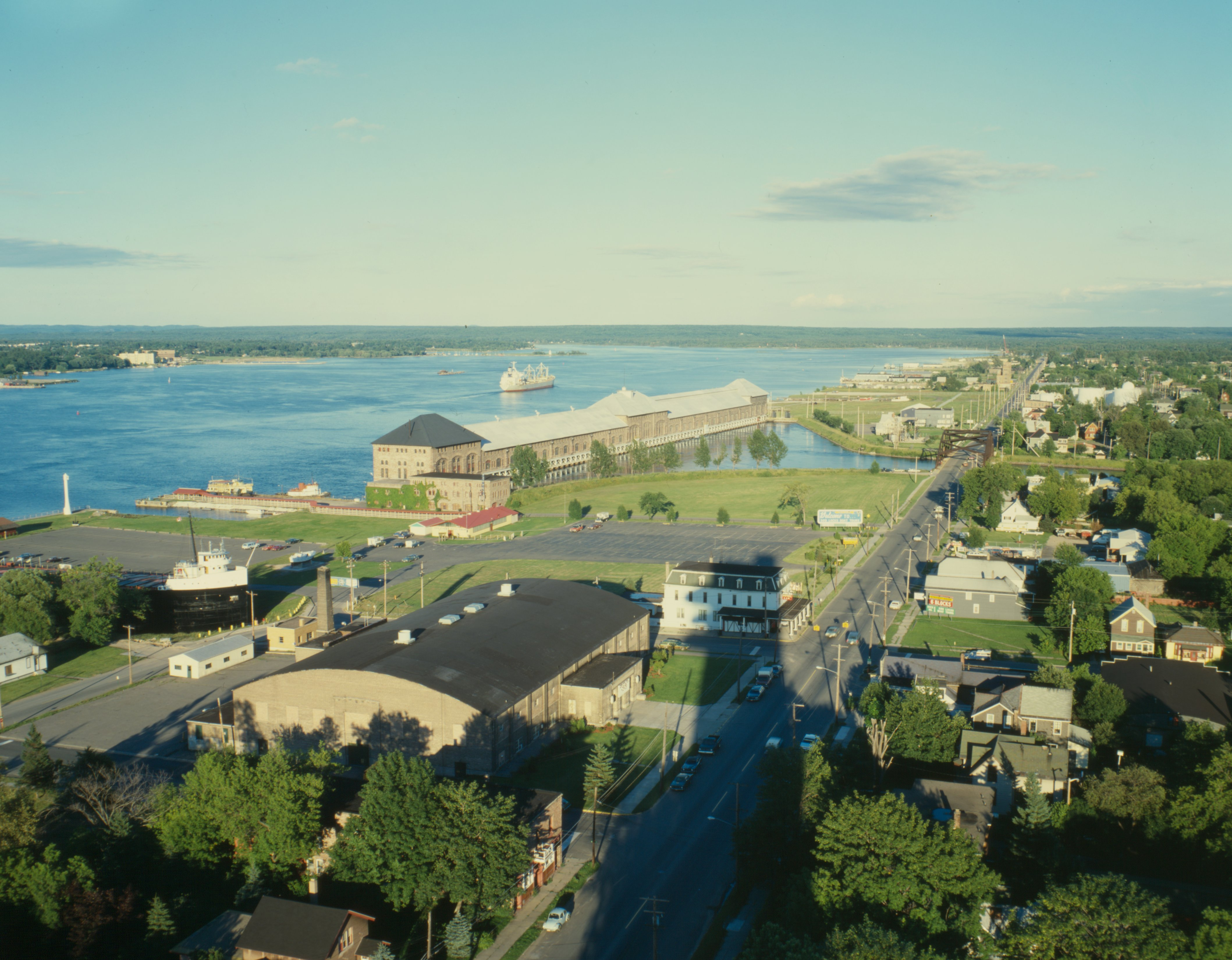
(1978) Sault Ste. Marie, Michigan

== The ballpark ==
The 1905 Sault Ste. Marie Soos hosted home minor league games at Brady Park. Still in use today as a public park, Brady Park is located at 163 East Water Street in Sault Ste. Marie, Michigan.

== Year–by–year record ==
Year	Record	Finish	Manager	Playoffs/notes
1905	29–55	4th	W.B. Earle	Team disbanded August 22

== Notable alumni ==
- Donie Bush (1904)
- Eddie Cicotte (1904) Black Sox scandal
- Fred Curtis (1905)
- Fred Luderus (1905)

== See also ==
- Sault Ste. Marie Soos players
