= Houghton Giants =

American baseball team (1890–91, 1906–07)

- 1906–1907; (1890–1891, 1906–1907); Houghton, Michigan

Minor league affiliations
- Class: Independent (1890–1891); Class C (1906); Class D (1907)
- League: Upper Peninsula League (1890–1891); Northern-Copper Country League (1906–1907)

Major league affiliations
- Team: None

Minor league titles
- League titles (1): 1890

Team data
- Name: Houghton (1890–1891); Houghton Giants (1906–1907)
- Ballpark: East Houghton Grounds (1890–1891); Ripley Sands Park (1906–1907)

The Houghton Giants were a minor league baseball team based in Houghton, Michigan. In 1906 and 1907, the "Giants" played as members of the Northern-Copper Country League. The Giants were preceded in minor league play by the "Houghton" team that played as members of the independent Upper Peninsula League in 1890 and 1891, winning the 1890 league championship.

Houghton first hosted home minor league games at the East Houghton Grounds through 1891 and then at Ripley Sands Park.

== History ==
Houghton, Michigan began minor league play in 1890, hosting the "Houghton" team in the Independent level Upper Peninsula League. In their first season of play, Houghton won the 1896 championship. Houghton ended the season with a 23-12 record, finishing 4.0 games ahead of the second place Ishpeming team, who were followed by the Marquette Undertakers and Calumet Red Jackets. The Hancock and Negaunee teams both folded before the season had concluded.

In 1891, Houghton placed last in the Upper Peninsula League. With a final record of 27–35, the Houghton team placed fourth in the final standings of the four-team league, finishing 10.0 games behind the first place Calumet Red Jackets.

After a fifteen year hiatus, minor league baseball returned to Houghton in 1906, when the Houghton "Giants" became charter members of the eight–team Class C level Northern-Copper Country League.

In their first season of play in the new league, the 1906 Houghton Giants placed second in the Northern-Copper Country League. Beginning play on May 17, 1906, the Houghton Giants ended the 1906 season with a record of 56–65, playing under manager Howard Cassiboine. Houghton finished 1.5 games behind the first place Calumet Aristocrats (61–37) and ahead of Winnipeg Maroons (57–38), Duluth White Sox (52–44), Lake Linden Sandy Lakes (40–56) and Fargo Trolley Dodgers (35–59) in the final standings. The Hancock Infants (29–34) and Grand Forks Forkers (13–40) teams folded during the season. Houghton pitchers Roy Beecher, Paul Grimes, Harry Bond and Rube Berry each won 18 games to tie for the league lead.

The Houghton Giants played their final season in 1907. The 1907 Northern-Copper Country League played as a four–team Class D level league. Beginning play on May 14, 1907, the Houghton Giants placed third in the 1907 the Northern-Copper Country League standings, when the season ended early on September 2, 1907. Houghton ended the 1907 season with a 47–55 record, playing under managers M.O. Taylor and Pat Flaherty. The Giants finished 25.5 games behind the first place Winnipeg Maroons (70–27), 2nd place Duluth White Sox (49–53) and ahead of the fourth place Calumet Aristocrats (34–65) in the final standings.

The Northern-Copper Country League permanently folded after the 1907 season. Houghton, Michigan has not hosted another minor league team.

== The ballparks ==
The Houghton minor league teams of 1890 and 1891 played home games at the East Houghton Grounds. Originally constructed in the 1880's, the East Houghton Grounds were noted to have been located just south of Hubbell Hall, on today's campus of Michigan Technological University, Houghton, Michigan.

The Houghton Giants hosted home minor league games at Ripley Sands Park. With the ballpark being located on Portage Lake, fans gained access to the park by traveling on a passenger steamer.

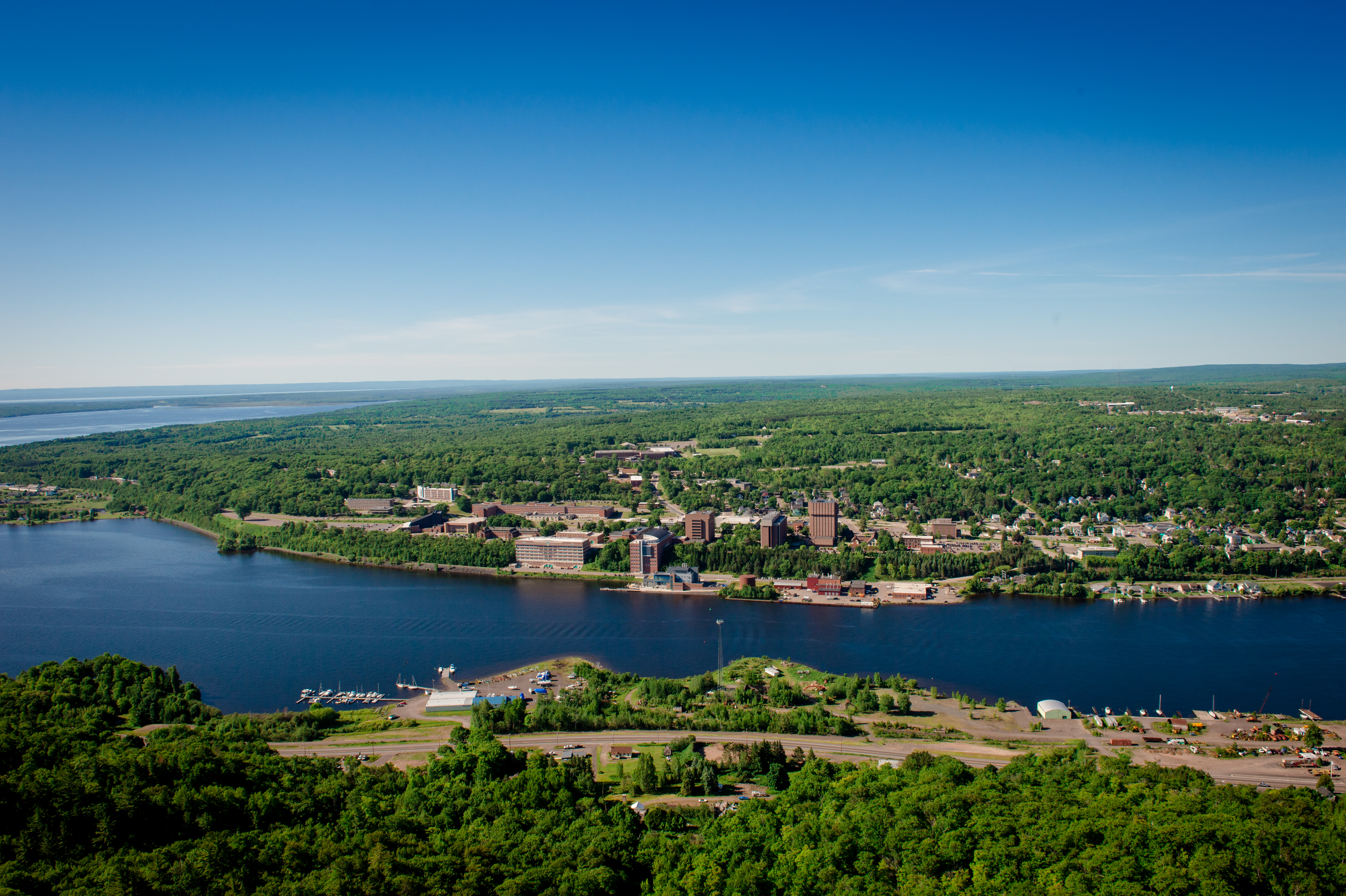
(2015) Aerial view of Technological University campus, Houghton, Michigan

== Timeline ==
Year(s)	# Yrs.	Team	Level	League	Ballpark
1890–1891	2	Houghton	Independent	Upper Peninsula League	East Houghton Grounds
1906	1	Houghton Giants	Class C	Northern-Copper Country League	Ripley Sands Park
1907	1	Houghton Giants	Class D	Northern-Copper Country League	Ripley Sands Park

== Year–by–year record ==
Year	Record	Finish	Manager	Playoffs/notes
1890	23–12	1st	NA	League champions
1891	27–35	4th	NA	No playoffs held
1906	56–65	2nd	Howard Cassiboine	No playoffs held
1913	47–55	3rd	Kid Taylor / Pat Flaherty	Season shortened to Sept 2.

== Notable alumni ==
- Ed Barry (1906)
- Roy Beecher (1906)
- Pat Flaherty (1907, MGR)
- Frank Miller (1907)
- Jerome Utley (1906)
- Buzzy Wares (1906)
