= Ishpeming-Negaunee Unions =

Ishpeming–Negaunee Unions
- 1890–1892; Ishpeming, Michigan

Minor league affiliations
- Class: Independent (1890–1892)
- League: Upper Peninsula League (1890–1891); Wisconsin-Michigan League (1892)

Major league affiliations
- Team: None

Minor league titles
- League titles (0): None

Team data
- Name: Negaunee (1890); Ishpeming (1890–1891); Ishpeming–Negaunee Unions (1892)
- Ballpark: Ishpeming Grounds (1890–1891); Union Park (1892)

The Ishpeming–Negaunee Unions was the final moniker of the minor league baseball teams based in Ishpeming and Negaunee, Michigan. From 1890 to 1892, Ishpeming–Negaunee teams played as members of the Upper Peninsula League in 1890 and 1891 and Wisconsin-Michigan League in 1892.

The Ishpeming–Negaunee teams hosted home games at the Ishpeming Grounds in the 1890 and 1891 seasons and Union Park in 1892.

== History ==
Prior to minor league play, the two towns were noted to have amateur teams beginning in 1874, playing in a game won by the Ishpeming Mutuals 37–15 over Negaunee.

Ishpeming and Negaunee teams both began minor league play in 1890. The Ishpeming and Negaunee teams became charter members of the six–team Independent-level Upper Peninsula League. The Calumet Red Jackets, Hancock, Houghton and Marquette Undertakers teams joined Ishpeming and Negaunee in beginning league play.

In their first season of minor league play, the Ishpeming team ended the 1890 season with a 19–16 record under manager Jim Tray and Negaunee folded before the season concluded with Bert Cook managing the team. Ishpeming placed second in the final standings and finished 4.0 games behind the first place Houghton team and ahead of the 3rd place Marquette Undertakers and the fourth place Calumet Red Jackets. The teams from Hancock and Negaunee folded before the season concluded, with final records unknown.

In 1891, Ishpeming continued play and placed third in the four–team Upper Peninsula League. With a final record of 24–30, playing under manager Jim Tray, Ishpeming finished 8.0 games behind the first place Calumet Red Jackets. The Upper Peninsula League permanently folded following the 1891 season.

The "Ishpeming–Negaunee Unions" team was coined and continued play in a new league in 1892, as the neighboring cities partnered to field the franchise. The Unions became charter members of the six–team Independent-level Wisconsin–Michigan League. The Green Bay, Marinette Badgers, Marquette Undertakers, Menominee and Oshkosh Indians teams joined Ishpeming–Negaunee in league play.

In their final season of play, the Unions folded during the season. On August 5, 1892, Marquette folded with a record of 20–29 and then Ishpeming–Negaunee was dropped August 9, 1892, because of the distance for the remaining teams to travel. Joe Quest was the Unions' manager, as the team finished with a 24–20 record when folding. The Green Bay Bays were the league champions as the Wisconsin–Michigan League permanently folded after the 1892 season.

Ishpeming has not hosted another minor league team.

== The ballparks ==
In 1890 and 1891, the Ishpeming team hosted minor league home games at the Ishpeming Grounds.

The 1892 Ishpeming–Negaunee Unions played minor league home games at the Union Park. The ballpark was referenced to have been located at the fairgrounds situated between Ishpeming and Negaunee. It was noted that in 1919, the park hosted a Green Bay Packers football game. Today, it is reported the ballpark site lies along the Iron Ore Heritage Trail, which runs between Ishpeming and Negaunee.

== Timeline ==
Year(s)	# Yrs.	Team	Level	League	Ballpark
1890	1	Negaunee	Independent	Upper Peninsula League	Ishpeming Grounds
1890–1891	2	Ishpeming	Independent	Upper Peninsula League	Ishpeming Grounds
1892	1	Ishpeming–Negaunee Unions	Independent	Wisconsin-Michigan League	Union Park

== Year–by–year record ==
Year	Record	Finish	Manager	Playoffs/notes
1890 (1)	00–00	NA	Bert Cook	Negaunee record unknown Folded during season
1890 (2)	19–16	2nd	Jim Tray	Ishpeming record
1891	24–30	3rd	Jim Tray	No playoffs held
1892	24–20	NA	Joe Quest	Team folded August 9

== Notable alumni ==
- Charlie Abbey (1892)
- Bill Garfield (1892)
- Moxie Hengel (1892)
- Youngy Johnson (1892)
- Mike Morrison (1892)
- Tom O'Meara (1892)
- Joe Quest (1892, MGR)
- George Rooks (1892)
- Wally Taylor (1892)
- Joe Walsh (1892)

== See also ==
- Ishpeming–Negaunee Unions players
