= Hancock Infants =

American baseball team (1890, 1905–06)

- 1890–1906; (1890, 1905–1906); Hancock, Michigan

Minor league affiliations
- Class: Independent (1890); Class D (1905); Class C (1906)
- League: Upper Peninsula League (1890); Copper Country Soo League (1905); Northern-Copper Country League (1906)

Major league affiliations
- Team: None

Minor league titles
- League titles (0): None

Team data
- Name: Hancock (1890); Hancock Infants (1905–1906)
- Ballpark: Sack's Park (1905–1906)

The Hancock Infants was the only moniker of the minor league baseball teams based in Hancock, Michigan. Between 1890 and 1906, Hancock teams played as members of the 1890 Upper Peninsula League, 1905 Copper Country Soo League and 1906 Northern-Copper Country League.

The Hancock Infants hosted home minor league games at Sack's Park.

== History ==
Hancock, Michigan began minor league play in 1890. Hancock hosted the Hancock team in the Independent level Upper Peninsula League. In their first season of play, Hancock folded before the end of the season, playing under manager Thomas Ryan. Houghton ended the season with a 23–12 record to win the championship, finishing 4.0 games ahead of the second place Ishpeming team, who were followed by the Marquette Undertakers and Calumet Red Jackets. The Hancock and Negaunee teams both folded before the season had concluded and their records are unknown.

Playing in the 1904 Copper County League, Hancock and the league have no 1904 records known. In 1905, the Hancock Infants placed third playing in a new league. Playing as members of the four–team Class D level Copper Country Soo League, Hancock finished the season with a record of 38–58 playing under managers John Condon and Charles Rodgers. The Infants finished 22.5 games behind the first place and eventual league champion Calumet Aristocrats in the final regular season standings.

In 1906, the Hancock Infants continued play, as the team became charter members of the eight–team Class C level Northern-Copper Country League.

Beginning play in the new league, the 1906 Hancock Infants folded from the Northern-Copper Country League during the season. After beginning league play on May 17, 1906, the Hancock Infants folded on July 29, 1906, while playing under manager Paul Wreath. In the final league standings, the Calumet Aristocrats finished ahead of Houghton Giants (56–65), Winnipeg Maroons (57–38), Duluth White Sox (52–44), Lake Linden Sandy Lakes (40–56) and Fargo Trolley Dodgers (35–59). The Hancock Infants (29–34) and Grand Forks Forkers (13–40) teams both folded on July 29.

Hancock, Michigan has not hosted another minor league team.

== The ballparks ==
(1906) Panorama, Hancock, Michigan.

The Hancock Infants played home minor league games at Sack's Park. In the era, the ballpark was located on Ingot Street at Driving Park Road, Hancock, Michigan.

== Timeline ==
Year(s)	# Yrs.	Team	Level	League	Ballpark
1890	1	Hancock	Independent	Upper Peninsula League	Sack's Park
1905	1	Hancock Infants	Class D	Copper Country Soo League	Sack's Park
1906	1	Hancock Infants	Class C	Northern-Copper Country League	Sack's Park

== Year–by–year record ==
Year	Record	Finish	Manager	Playoffs/notes
1890	00–0	NA	Thomas Ryan	Team folded during season Record unknown
1905	38–58	3rd	John Condon / Charles Rodgers	Did not qualify
1906	29–34	NA	Paul Wreath	Team folded July 29

== Notable alumni ==
- Ed Kippert (1905)
- Buzzy Wares (1905)
