= Calumet Aristocrats =

American baseball team (1890–91, 1904–07)

- 1890–1907; (1890–1891, 1904–1907); Laurium, Michigan

Minor league affiliations
- Class: Independent (1890–1891); Class D (1904–1905); Class C (1906); Class D (1907)
- League: Upper Peninsula League (1890–1891); Copper Country Soo League (1904–1905); Northern-Copper Country League (1906–1907)

Major league affiliations
- Team: None

Minor league titles
- League titles (2): 1891; 1906
- Conference titles (1): 1905

Team data
- Name: Calumet Red Jackets (1890–1891); Calumet Aristocrats (1904–1907)
- Ballpark: Laurium Park (1890–1891, 1905); Athletic Park (1890–1891, 1904–1907)

The Calumet Aristocrats were a minor league baseball team based in Laurium, Michigan. The city was called "Calumet" in the era. The Aristocrats were members of the Class D level Copper Country Soo League in 1904 and 1905 and the Class C level Northern-Copper Country League in 1906 and 1907. The Calumet Red Jackets preceded the Aristocrats, playing in 1890 and 1891 as members of the Upper Peninsula League. Calumet teams won league championships in 1891 and 1906 and a league pennant in 1905.

Calumet hosted minor league home games at Athletic Park with select games held at Larium Park. Today, Athletic Park is known as Agassiz Park.

== History ==
Calumet, Michigan began minor league play in 1890. Calumet hosted the Calumet Red Jackets team in the Independent level Upper Peninsula League. In their first season of play, the Red Jackets finished with a record of 13–20 to place fourth, playing under manager Jack Halpin. Houghton ended the season with a 23-12 record to win the championship, finishing 4.0 games ahead of the second place Ishpeming team, who were followed by the Marquette Undertakers and Calumet Red Jackets.

The Calumet use of the "Red Jackets" moniker corresponds to the city of Calumet originally being named "Red Jacket," beginning in 1864. Until 1895, the current town of Laurium, Michigan was named Calumet.

In 1891, the Calumet Red Jackets won the Upper Peninsula League championship. With a final record of 36–24, the Red Jackets finished 5.0 games ahead of the second place Marquette Undertakers in final standings of the four–team league. Jack Halpin again managed Calumet, who also finished ahead of the third place Ishpeming and fourth place Houghton teams.

After playing in the 1904 Copper County League with no records known, in 1905, the Calumet Aristocrats won the pennant playing in a new league. Playing as members of the four–team Class D level Copper Country Soo League, Calumet finished the season with a record of 61–36 to finish in first place. Playing under manager Charles Fitchel, the Aristocrats finished 2.0 games ahead of the second place Lake Linden Lakers. In the playoff, Lake Linden swept Calumet in four games.

In 1906, the Calumet Aristocrats became charter members of the eight–team Class C level Northern-Copper Country League.

In their first season of play in the new league, the 1906 Calumet Aristocrats won the Northern-Copper Country League championship. Beginning play on May 17, 1906, the first place Calumet Aristocrats finished the season with a final record of 61–37, playing under manager G.W. Orr. The Aristocrats finished ahead of Houghton Giants (56–65), Winnipeg Maroons (57–38), Duluth White Sox (52–44), Lake Linden Sandy Lakes (40–56) and Fargo Trolley Dodgers (35–59) in the final standings. The Hancock Infants (29–34) and Grand Forks Forkers (13–40) teams folded during the season.

The Calumet Aristocrats played their final season in 1907. The 1907 Northern-Copper Country League played as a four–team Class D level league. Beginning play on May 14, 1907, the Houghton Giants placed fourth in the 1907 the Northern-Copper Country League standings, when the season ended early on September 2, 1907. Houghton ended the 1907 season with a 47–55 record, playing under managers M.O. Taylor and Pat Flaherty. The Giants finished 25.5 games behind the first place Winnipeg Maroons (70–27), 2nd place Duluth White Sox (49–53) and ahead of the 4th place Calumet Aristocrats (34–65) in the final standings.

The Northern-Copper Country League permanently folded after the 1907 season. Laurium, Michigan has not hosted another minor league team.

Calumet, Michigan panorama c1900

== The ballparks ==
For the duration of their minor league play, Calumet teams played home games at Athletic Park. The park was later renamed Agassiz Park. The ballpark was referenced to have been located at 4th Street & Elm Street. Today, Agassiz Park is still in use as a public park.

In 1890, 1891 and 1905, the Calumet teams were noted to have hosted select home minor league games at Laurium Park. The ballpark was referenced to have been located on 3rd Street at the railroad tracks in Laurium, Michigan.

== Timeline ==
Year(s)	# Yrs.	Team	Level	League	Ballpark
1890–1891	2	Calumet Red Jackets	Independent	Upper Peninsula League	Athletic Park / Larium Park
1904–1905	2	Calumet Aristocrats	Class D	Copper Country Soo League	Athletic Park
1906	1	Calumet Aristocrats	Class C	Northern-Copper Country League	Athletic Park
1907	1	Calumet Aristocrats	Class D	Northern-Copper Country League	Athletic Park; Larium Park

== Year–by–year records ==
Year	Record	Finish	Manager	Playoffs/notes
1890	13–20	4th	Jack Halpin	No playoffs held
1891	36–24	1st	Jack Halpin	League champions
1904	00–00	NA	NA	League records unknown
1905	61–36	1st	Charles Fitchel	Lost playoff
1906	61–37	1st	G.W. Orr	League champions
1907	34–65	4th	Frank Mullane / Christy Egan	Season shortened to Sept 2.

== Notable alumni ==
- Dad Clarke (1905)
- Biddy Dolan (1906–1907)
- Ed Kippert (1906)
- Tom Leahy (1906)
- Doc Miller (1906)
- Pat Paige (1905)
- Bert Sincock (1907)
- Hosea Siner (1906)

== See also ==
- Calumet Aristocrats players
