= Wisconsin–Michigan League =

- Formerly: Upper Peninsula League
- Classification: Independent (1892)
- Sport: Minor League Baseball
- First season: 1892
- Folded: 1892
- President: A.E. Mountain (1892); Frank Murphy (1892)
- No. of teams: 6
- Country: United States of America
- Most titles: 1 Green Bay (1892)

The Wisconsin–Michigan League (also referred to as the Michigan–Wisconsin League by some sources) was a minor league baseball league that played in the 1892 season. The six–team Independent level Wisconsin–Michigan League evolved from the Upper Peninsula League and consisted of franchises based in Michigan and Wisconsin.

== History ==
The Wisconsin–Michigan League first played as a semi–professional league in the 1891 season, with the Appleton, Fond du Lac, Green Bay, Marinette, Oconto and Oshkosh teams comprising the six–team league.

The Wisconsin–Michigan League became a minor league and continued play in the 1892 season as a non–signatory, Independent level league. The Green Bay Bays, Ishpeming-Negaunee Unions, Marinette Badgers, Marquette Undertakers, Menominee Wolverines and Oshkosh Indians were the charter members.

In their first season of play, the Wisconsin–Michigan League began games on May 27, 1892. Green Bay won the 1892 Wisconsin–Michigan League championship with a 48–39 overall record in the six–team league, as the Marinette and Ishpeming-Negaunee Unions franchises folded during the season. The final records were led by Green Bay, followed by the second place Menominee Wolverines (44–40), Marinette Badgers (45–44) and Oshkosh Indians (41–50), with the Marquette Undertakers (20–29) and Ishpeming-Negaunee Unions (24–20) before folding.

During the season, it was reported that Green Bay president Frank W. Murphy, who also served as president of the league, supplemented his roster with players obtained from the Terre Haute Hottentots and other teams en route to winning the championship. New manager Sam LaRocque had earlier played with Terre Haute in 1892.

The Wisconsin–Michigan League permanently folded following the 1892 season.

== Wisconsin–Michigan League teams ==
Team name	City represented	Ballpark	Year(s) active
Green Bay Bays	Green Bay, Wisconsin	Unknown	1892
Ishpeming-Negaunee Unions	Ishpeming, Michigan	Union Park	1892
Marinette Badgers	Marinette, Wisconsin	Fairgrounds Driving Park	1892
Marquette Undertakers	Marquette, Michigan	Fair Avenue Grounds	1892
Menominee Wolverines	Menominee, Michigan	Unknown	1892
Oshkosh Indians	Oshkosh, Wisconsin	Unknown	1892

== Standings and statistics ==
=== 1892 Wisconsin–Michigan League ===
Team standings	W	L	PCT	GB	Managers
Green Bay Bays	48	39	.552	–	Louis Shoeneck / Sam LaRocque
Menominee	44	40	.524	2½	William Lucas
Marinette Badgers	17	18	.486	4	Joe Cantillon / Mike Morrison / Jim Donahue
Oshkosh Indians	13	20	.394	9	Charles Faatz
Ishpeming-Negaunee Unions	24	20	.545	NA	Joe Quest
Marquette Undertakers	29	29	.408	NA	George Wilbur

Marquette and Ishpeming-Negaunee disbanded in August

Player statistics
Player	Team	Stat	Tot
Willie McGill	Menominee	W	14
Robert Gayle	Green Bay	W	14
Robert Gayle	Green Bay	ShO	7
Robert Gayle	Green Bay	PCT	.824 14-3

== Notable alumni ==
Baseball Hall of Fame member Hank O'Day played for the 1892 Marinette Badgers.
