= Upper Peninsula League =

- Classification: Independent (1890–1891)
- Sport: Minor League Baseball
- First season: 1890
- Folded: 1891
- Replaced by: Wisconsin-Michigan League
- President: J.P. Mason (1890–1891)
- No. of teams: 6
- Country: United States of America
- Most titles: 1 Houghton (1890); Calumet Red Jackets (1891)

The Upper Peninsula League was a minor league baseball league that played in the 1890 and 1891 seasons. The six–team Independent level Upper Peninsula League consisted of franchises based exclusively in Michigan.

== History ==
The Upper Peninsula League formed and began play in the 1890 season as a non–signatory, Independent level league. The Calumet Red Jackets, Hancock, Houghton, Ishpeming, Marquette Undertakers and Negaunee teams were the charter members.

In their first season of play, the league began the schedule on May 31, 1890. Houghton won the 1890 Upper Peninsula League championship with a 23–12 overall record in the six–team league, as the Hancock and Negaunee franchises folded during the season.

The Upper Peninsula League played with four teams in 1891. The Calumet Red Jackets won the championship with a 36–24 record. The Upper Peninsula League permanently folded following the 1891 season, evolving into the Wisconsin–Michigan League in 1892.

The UPL is a part of the short story “Horseshoes”, written by baseball writer and author Ring Lardner.

== Upper Peninsula League teams ==
Team name	City represented	Ballpark	Year(s) active
Calumet Red Jackets	Calumet, Michigan	Athletic Park	1890 to 1891
Hancock	Hancock, Michigan	Unknown	1890
Houghton	Houghton, Michigan	East Houghton Grounds	1890 to 1891
Ishpeming	Ishpeming, Michigan	Union Park	1890 to 1891
Marquette Undertakers	Marquette, Michigan	Fair Avenue Grounds	1890 to 1891
Negaunee	Negaunee, Michigan	Unknown	1890

== League standings ==
1890 Upper Peninsula League standings

Team standings	W	L	PCT	GB	Managers
Houghton	23	12	.657	–	Unknown
Ishpeming	19	16	.543	4	James Tray
Marquette Undertakers	17	18	.486	6	Dan Sullivan
Calumet Red Jackets	13	20	.394	9	Jack Halpin
Negaunee	NA	NA	NA	NA	Bert Cook
Hancock	NA	NA	NA	NA	Thomas Ryan

Hancock and Negaunee disbanded mid–season

1891 Upper Peninsula League standings

Team standings	W	L	PCT	GB	Managers
Calumet Red Jackets	36	24	.600	–	Jack Halpin
Marquette Undertakers	34	22	.515	5	Ed Douglas
Ishpeming	24	30	.444	9	James Tray
Houghton	27	35	.435	10	Unknown
