= Bert Sincock =

Canadian baseball player (1887–1946)

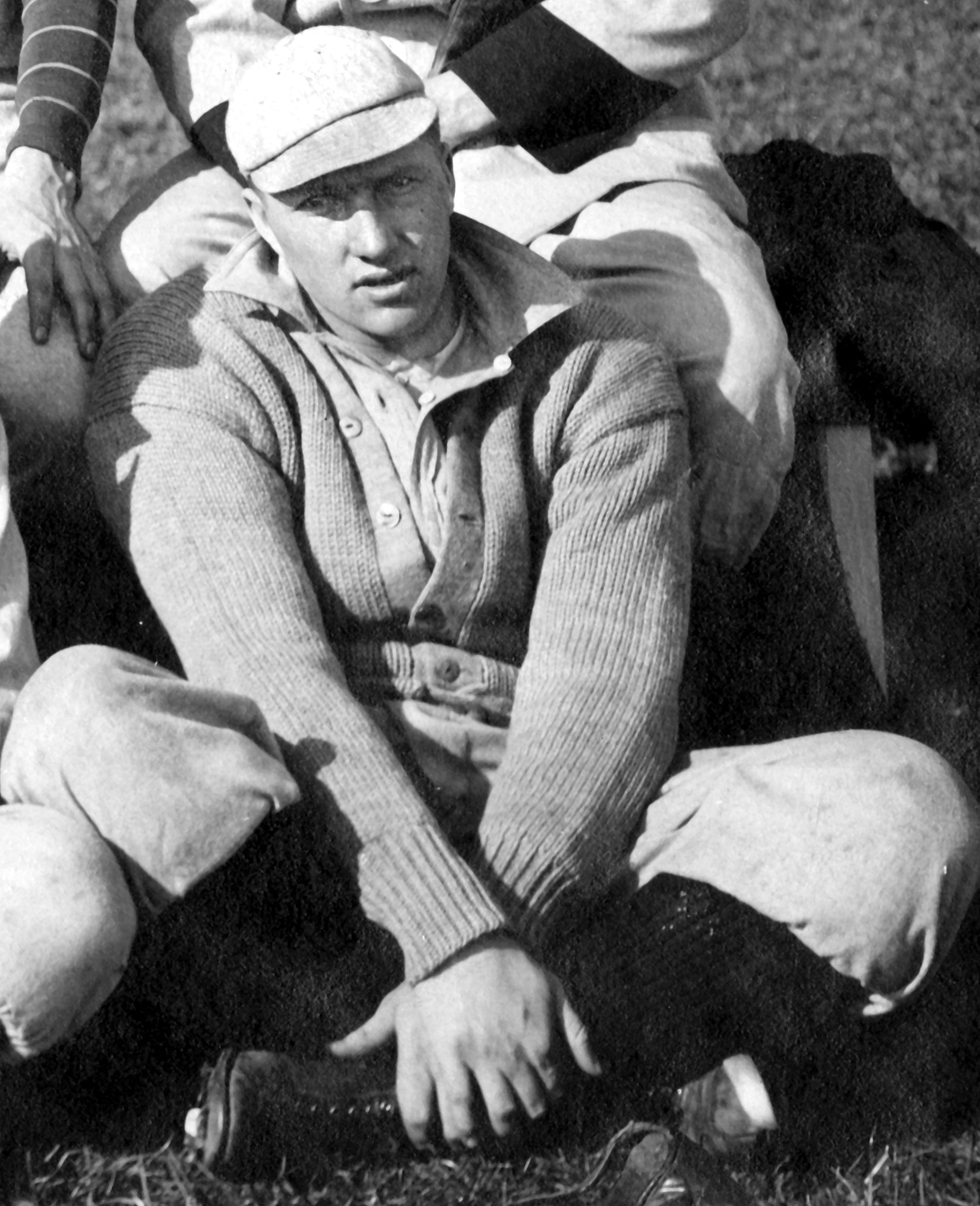
- Sincock cropped from 1908 Michigan baseball team portrait
- Pitcher
- Born: September 8, 1887; Barkerville, British Columbia, Canada
- Died: August 1, 1946 (aged 58); Houghton, Michigan, U.S.
- Batted: Left Threw: Left

MLB debut
- June 25, 1908, for the Cincinnati Reds

Last MLB appearance
- June 25, 1908, for the Cincinnati Reds

MLB statistics
- Win–loss record: 0-0
- Strikeouts: 1
- Earned run average: 3.86
- Stats at Baseball Reference

Teams
- Cincinnati Reds (1908)

Herbert Sylvester Sincock (September 8, 1887 – August 1, 1946) was a Canadian left-handed pitcher in Major League Baseball. In 1908, he played both college baseball at the University of Michigan and professional baseball for the Cincinnati Reds.

== Early years ==
Sincock was born in September 1887 at Barkerville, British Columbia, a boomtown developed during the Cariboo Gold Rush. His father, Samuel John Sincock, was an immigrant from Cornwall, England, who originally settled in the Copper Country of Michigan's Upper Peninsula and moved to British Columbia in 1877, where he engaged in prospecting and placer mining. Samuel was listed in the 1887 Barkerville Directory as a miner. For a time during the gold rush, Barkerville was the largest North American city located west of Chicago and north of San Francisco. At the time of the 1891 Census of Canada, Sincock was living with his parents, Samuel J. Sincock and Mary (Higgins) Sincock, in Richfield, Cariboo, British Columbia, where his father was recorded as being employed as a gold miner. Herbert was the youngest of six children identified in the census record.

By the time of the 1900 United States Census, Sincock was living in Laurium, Calumet Township, in Michigan's Upper Peninsula with his mother Mary, five siblings, and grandfather William Higgins. A biographical profile of Samuel Sincock indicates he moved to Okanogan County, Washington, in 1893, though no indication is given as to whether he was divorced from Herbert's mother, Mary Sincock.

== Engineering student and baseball player ==
In 1906, Sincock enrolled at the University of Michigan. He studied engineering there from 1906 to 1908 but did not receive a degree. While attending Michigan, he played baseball as a pitcher for the 1908 Michigan Wolverines baseball team. In his first appearance for Michigan, in May 1908, Sincock was the losing pitcher in a 16-inning game against Cornell at Ithaca, New York. Sincock held Cornell to two runs in the first 15 innings, but Cornell scored in the 16th inning to win the game, 3–2. Sincock struck out 11 batters in the game and gave up 12 hits and two walks. The Michigan Alumnus wrote that the honors of the game went to Sincock and described the winning run as follows: "Cornell came to bat in the sixteenth, and, in the growing darkness, secured a run, winning one of the most sensational games of college ball on record." Sincock pitched again against Brown at Providence, Rhode Island, on May 23, 1908. Sincock was the losing pitcher in a 5–4 game. Sincock was credited by The Michigan Alumnus with pitching a good game, but an error in the fifth inning by Michigan's left fielder "let in three runs and seriously affected the result."

While attending Michigan, Sincock had also played for the Calumet Aristocrats in the 1907 Northern-Copper Country League. He compiled a record of 6–9 in 15 games for the Aristocrats. He also played for the Harrisburg Senators in the Tri-State League in 1908.

During the summer of 1908, Sincock was signed by the Cincinnati Reds. Sincock made his Major League Baseball debut on June 25, 1908. He pitched 4 2/3 innings for the Reds and allowed two runs and three hits. He also struck out one batter.

Sincock was also the first British Columbian to make it to the major leagues. It took 47 years for another British Columbia native, Bob Alexander, to make his major league debut with the Baltimore Orioles in 1955.

== Later years ==
At the time of the 1910 United States Census, Sincock was living with his mother, grandmother, and a sister at Laurim in Calumet Township, Michigan. He was employed as a solicitor for an electric company.

In a draft registration card completed in June 1917, Sincock stated that he was living in Grand Forks, North Dakota, where he was employed as the manager of the new business department for the Red River Power Co. He also stated that he was a naturalized United States citizen with a wife and two children under age 12. The draft registrar described him as medium height, stout, and having blue eyes and light hair.

At the time of the 1920 United States Census, Sincock was living in Nashwauk Township, Minnesota. He was living with his brother-in-law and his two children, Gordon and Mary. He was employed as a draftsman.

At the time of the 1930 United States Census, Sincock was living in Chicago and employed as a teacher in a public school. He was living with his wife Lillian and 13-year-old daughter Mary.

In a draft registration card completed in April 1942, Sincock stated that he was living in Chicago. He was living and working at the New Lawrence Hotel at 1020 Lawrence Avenue, several blocks southwest of Soldier Field.

In his later years, Sincock was employed as the manager of the Douglass House, a hotel in downtown Houghton, Michigan. In August 1946, while still employed as the manager of the Douglass House, Sincock died suddenly at Houghton.
