= Copper Country Soo League =

Minor Baseball League

Copper County Soo League
- Classification: Class D (1905)
- Sport: Minor League Baseball
- First season: 1905
- Folded: 1905
- Replaced by: Northern-Copper Country League
- President: Dr. G.W. Orr (1905)
- No. of teams: 4
- Country: United States of America
- Last champion: Lake Linden Lakers (1905)
- Related competitions: Northern League

The Copper Country Soo League was a minor league baseball league which operated in four Michigan cities in 1905. The league had four teams in their lone season. Three Major League Baseball players, Donie Bush, Fred Luderus, and Pat Paige, are known to have played in the league.

== History ==
The Copper County Soo League began play on May 17, 1905, with the Calumet Aristocrats, Hancock Infants, Lake Linden Lakers and Sault Ste. Marie Soos as charter members of the Class D league. There was a short lived merger of the Copper Country-Soo League and Northern League which began June 1. The newly formed league was called the Northern Copper Country-Soo League. The first official game took place June 1 between the Duluth and Lake Linden clubs. The merger ended July 28 and the two leagues resumed separate schedules.

The Lake Linden Lakers won the 1905 Copper Country Soo League championship.

On March 18, 1906, the Copper Country Soo League and Northern League re-merged to form the Northern-Copper Country League, beginning play on May 17, 1906. The merged league disbanded following the 1907 season and a reorganized Northern League resumed separate operations in 1908.

== Teams ==
- Calumet Aristocrats (Laurium, Michigan)
- Hanock Infants (Hancock, Michigan)
- Lake Linden Lakers (Lake Linden, Michigan)
- Sault Ste. Marie Soos (Sault Ste. Marie, Michigan)

== Standings ==
1905 Copper Country Soo League

Team standings	W	L	PCT	GB	Managers
Calumet Aristocrats	61	36	.629	-	Charles Fichtel
Lake Linden Lakers	57	36	.613	2.0	Percy Glass
Hancock Infants	38	58	.396	22.5	John Condon / Charles Rodgers
Sault Ste. Marie Soos	29	55	.345	25.5	Billy Earle

Sault Ste. Marie disbanded August 22.
June 1 to July 28: Merged into "Northern Copper Country-Soo League". Merger ended July 28 old schedule resumed.
Playoff: Lake Linden 4 games, Calumet 0.
