= Lake Linden Lakers =

American baseball team (1904–1906)

- 1904–1906; Lake Linden, Michigan

Minor league affiliations
- Class: Class D (1904–1905); Class C (1906)
- League: Copper Country League (1904); Copper Country Soo League (1905); Northern-Copper Country League (1906)

Major league affiliations
- Team: None

Minor league titles
- League titles (1): 1905

Team data
- Name: Lake Linden Lakers (1904–1905); Lake Linden Sandy Cities (1906)
- Ballpark: Lake Linden Ball Park (1904–1906)

The Lake Linden Lakers were a minor league baseball team based in Lake Linden, Michigan. The 1904 and 1905 Lakers were followed by the 1906 Lake Linden "Sandy Cities," as the Lake Linden teams played as members of the 1904 Copper Country League, 1905 Copper Country Soo League and 1906 Northern-Copper Country League, winning the 1905 league championship.

Lake Linden hosted home minor league games at the Lake Linden Ball Park.

== History ==
Lake Linden, Michigan began minor league play in 1904 as members of the four–team Class D level Copper Country League, with final league records unknown.

The 1905 Lake Linden Lakers won a league championship. Playing as members of the four–team Class D level Copper Country Soo League, Lake Linden finished the season with a record of 57–36, placing second in the regular season standings playing under manager Perry Glass. The Lakers finished 2.0 games behind the first place Calumet Aristocrats and ahead of the third place Hancock Infants and 4th place Sault Ste. Marie Soos in the final regular season standing. In the league playoff, Lake Linden swept Calumet in four games and won the championship.

In 1906, the Hancock Infants became charter members of the eight–team Class C level Northern-Copper Country League, which was a merger between the Northern League and Copper County Soo League.

Beginning play in the new league, the 1906 Lake Linden Sandy Cities placed fifth the Northern-Copper Country League during the season. The 1906 team is also referred to as "Sandy Lakes" in some references. After beginning league play on May 17, 1906, Sandy Lakes finished with a 40–56 record, playing under manager William Foster, finishing 20.0 games behind 1first place Calumet. In the final league standings, the Calumet Aristocrats finished ahead of Houghton Giants (56–65), Winnipeg Maroons (57–38), Duluth White Sox (52–44), Lake Linden Sandy Lakes (40–56) and Fargo Trolley Dodgers (35–59). The Hancock Infants (29–34) and Grand Forks Forkers (13–40) teams both folded on July 29, 1906 prior to the end of the season. The Northern-Copper Country League permanently folded after the 1906 season.

Lake Linden, Michigan has not hosted another minor league team.

== The ballpark ==
(1906) Calumet and Hecla stamp mills. Lake Linden, Michigan.

The Lake Linden minor league teams played minor leaguehome games at Linden Lake Ball Park. The ballpark was referenced to have been located south of Lake Linden, Michigan.

== Timeline ==
Year(s)	# Yrs.	Team	Level	League	Ballpark
1904	1	Lake Linden Lakers	Class D	Copper Country League	Linden Lake Ball Park
1905	1	Lake Linden Lakers	Class D	Copper Country Soo League	Linden Lake Ball Park
1906	1	Lake Linden Sandy Cities	Class C	Northern-Copper Country League	Linden Lake Ball Park

== Year–by–year records ==
Year	Record	Finish	Manager	Playoffs/notes
1904	00–00	NA	NA	League records unknown
1905	57–36	2nd	Perry Glass	League champions
1906	40–56	5th	William Foster	No playoffs held

== Notable alumni ==
- Joe Burg (1905)
- Joe Koukalik (1905)
- Jack Lelivelt (1906)
