= Wally Taylor (baseball) =

American baseball player

- Second baseman
- Born: 1864; Covington, Kentucky, U.S.
- Died: November 10, 1922 (aged 58)

debut
- 1887, for the Birmingham Ironmakers

Last appearance
- 1905, for the New Bedford Whalers

Career statistics
- Batting average: .279
- Hits: 1443

Teams
- Birmingham Ironmakers (1887); Galesburg/Indianapolis (1890); Peoria Canaries (1890); Ottawa (1890); Joliet Giants (1891); Cedar Rapids Canaries (1891); Ishpeming-Negaunee Unions (1892); Menominee (1892); Birmingham Grays (1893); Mobile Blackbirds (1893); Mobile Bluebirds (1894); Milwaukee Brewers (1894–1896); Toronto Canucks (1897–1900); Montreal Royals (1900); Syracuse Stars (1900); Utica Pentups, (1901–1902); Newark Sailors, (1903); Manchester (1904); Haverhill Hustlers (1905); New Bedford Whalers (1905)

Wally Taylor (1864 – November 10, 1922) was an American professional baseball player and manager in the late 19th and early 20th centuries. Despite an extensive 17-year career in the minor leagues, many of them in Class A (the highest minor-league classification at the time), Taylor never played in a major-league game.

Taylor is most known for being part of the Milwaukee Brewers' rise to prominence during the 1890s. A Class A team at the time, Milwaukee signed Taylor and several other talented players, some of whom were recommended by Taylor. The Brewers soon became a minor-league powerhouse, eventually becoming a major-league team in 1901, although Taylor was no longer on the team.

Taylor's best season was arguably 1897, when he compiled a .318 batting average over 116 games for the Toronto Canucks. In 1899, Taylor became manager of the Toronto club. In 1900, Taylor became manager of the Syracuse Stars and from 1901 to 1902, the manager of the Utica Pentups, which played in the New York State League. He played professionally until 1905, his last season with the New Bedford Whalers, when he produced a mediocre batting average of .239.
