= Northern-Copper Country League =

US-Canada baseball league (1906–1907)

- Sport: Minor League Baseball
- Founded: 1906
- Folded: 1907
- No. of teams: 8
- Countries: United States; Canada
- Last champion: Winnipeg Maroons

The Northern-Copper Country League (NCCL) was a Minor League Baseball league in operation for two seasons, 1906 and 1907. The league featured clubs representing cities in Michigan, Minnesota, North Dakota, and Manitoba. On March 18, 1906, the Copper Country Soo League and Northern League merged to form the NCCL. The league was Class C in 1906 and Class D in 1907. The Grand Forks and Hancock clubs disbanded midway through the first season on July 29, 1906, and the entire league folded on September 2, 1907. The Northern League was reestablished in some of the former territory in 1908.

== Cities represented ==
- Duluth, Minnesota: Duluth White Sox 1906-1907
- Fargo, North Dakota: Fargo Trolley Dodgers 1906
- Grand Forks, North Dakota: Grand Forks Forkers 1906
- Hancock, Michigan: Hancock Infants 1906
- Houghton, Michigan: Houghton Giants 1906-1907
- Lake Linden, Michigan: Lake Linden Sandy Lakes 1906
- Laurium, Michigan: Calumet Aristocrats 1906-1907
- Winnipeg, MB: Winnipeg Maroons 1906-1907

== Standings & statistics ==
1906 Northern-Copper Country League
President: W. J. Price

Team standings	W	L	PCT	GB	Managers
Calumet Aristocrats	61	37	.622	-	G.W. Orr
Houghton Giants	56	35	.615	1½	Howard Cassiboine
Winnipeg Maroons	57	38	.600	2½	S. Anderson / Bill Hanrahan
Duluth White Sox	52	44	.542	8	Arthur O'Dea
Lake Linden Sandy Lakes	40	56	.417	20	William Foster
Fargo Trolley Dodgers	35	59	.372	24	Matt Camitsch
Hancock Infants	29	34	.460	NA	Paul Wreath
Grand Forks Forkers	13	40	.245	NA	McNeal/ F.J. Dudley; Bill Hanrahan

League, which became a Class C league on May 25. League formed as a merger between the Northern League & Copper Country Soo League.
Hancock & Grand Forks disbanded July 29.
No Playoffs were scheduled.

Player statistics
Player	Team	Stat	Tot	Player	Team	Stat	Tot
Beals Becker	Lake Linden	BA	.326	Paul Grimes	Calumet	W	18
Louis Piper	Winnipeg	Runs	75	Harry Bond	Winnipeg	W	18
Sam Meniece	Winnipeg	Hits	118	Rube Barry	Houghton	W	18
				Roy Beecher	Houghton	W	18
				Ad Brennan	Winnipeg	Pct	.727; 8-3

1907 Northern-Copper Country League
President: W. J. Price

Team standings	W	L	PCT	GB	Managers
Winnipeg Maroons	70	27	.722	-	Ed Herr
Duluth White Sox	49	53	.480	23½	Frank "Smiley" Smith / Harry Tracey
Houghton Giants	47	55	.464	25½	M.O. Taylor / Pat Flaherty
Calumet Aristocrats	34	65	.343	37	Frank Mullane / Christy Egan

League season shortened to September 2.

Player statistics
Player	Team	Stat	Tot	Player	Team	Stat	Tot
Rollie Zeider	Winnipeg	BA	.314	Alvin Cummings	Duluth	W	20
Rollie Zeider	Winnipeg	Runs	75	Ralph Terry	Winnipeg	Pct	.842: 16-3
Gene Cox	Winnipeg	Hits	117				
Rollie Zeider	Winnipeg	SB	59				

== Sources ==
The Encyclopedia of Minor League Baseball: Second and Third Editions.
