= Marquette Undertakers =

- 1890–1892; Marquette, Michigan

Minor league affiliations
- Class: Independent (1890–1892)
- League: Upper Peninsula League (1890–1891); Wisconsin-Michigan League (1892)

Major league affiliations
- Team: None

Minor league titles
- League titles (0): None

Team data
- Name: Marquette Undertakers (1890–1892)
- Ballpark: Fair Avenue Grounds (1890–1892)

The Marquette Undertakers were a minor league baseball team based in Marquette, Michigan. Marquette played as members of the independent Upper Peninsula League in 1890 and 1891 and Wisconsin-Michigan League in 1892, hosting minor league home games at the Fair Avenue Grounds.

== History ==
Marquette, Michigan began minor league play in 1890. The Marquette Undertakers became charter members of the six–team Independent level Upper Peninsula League.

In their first season of play, the Undertakers ended the season with a 17–18 record. Under manager Dan Sullivan, Marquette placed third and finished 6.0 games behind the first place Houghton team and second place Ishpeming, Michigan team. Marquette was followed by the fourth place Calumet Red Jackets in the final standings. The teams from Hancock, Michigan and Negaunee, Michigan folded before the season had concluded.

In 1891, the Marquette Undertakers continued play and placed second in the four–team Upper Peninsula League. With a final record of 34–32, playing under manager Ed Douglass, the Undertakers finished 5.0 games behind the first place Calumet Red Jackets. The Upper Peninsula League permanently folded following the 1891 season.

The Marquette Undertakers continued play in 1892 and became charter members of the six–team independent level Wisconsin-Michigan League. In their final season of play, the Undertakers folded during the season. On August 5, 1892, Marquette folded with a record of 20–29, playing under manager George Wilbur. The Green Bay Bays were the league champions as the league permanently folded after the season.

Marquette, Michigan has not hosted another minor league team.

== The ballpark ==
The Marquette Undertakers minor league teams were noted to have played home games at the Fair Avenue Grounds. The park was also known as Third Street Park. Located at Fair Avenue & 3rd Street, the site is now athletic fields on the campus of Northern Michigan University, Marquette, Michigan.

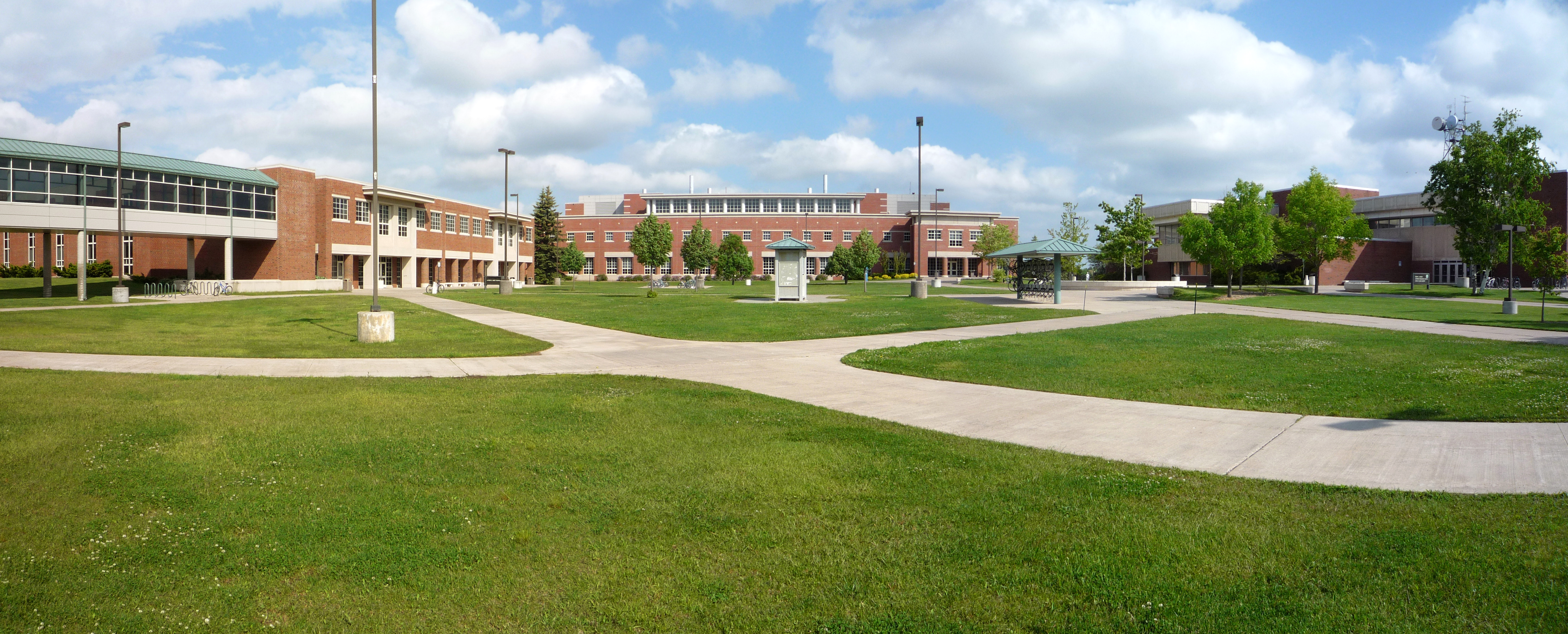
(2009) Northern Michigan University campus. Marquette, Michigan

== Timeline ==
Year(s)	# Yrs.	Team	Level	League	Ballpark
1890–1891	2	Marquette Undertakers	Independent	Upper Peninsula League	Fair Avenue Grounds
1892	1	Marquette Undertakers	Independent	Wisconsin-Michigan League	Fair Avenue Grounds

== Year–by–year records ==
Year	Record	Finish	Manager	Playoffs/notes
1890	17–18	3rd	Dan Sullivan	No playoffs held
1891	34–32	2nd	Ed Douglas	No playoffs held
1892	20–29	NA	George Wilbur	Team folded August 5

== Notable alumni ==
- Chick Pedroes (1891–1892)
- George Rooks (1892)
- Dan Sullivan (1890, MGR)

== See also ==
- Marquette Undertakers players
