= George Rooks =

American baseball player (1863–1935)

- Outfielder
- Born: October 21, 1863; Chicago, Illinois, U.S.
- Died: March 11, 1935 (aged 71); Chicago, Illinois, U.S.
- Batted: Right Threw: Right

MLB debut
- May 12, 1891, for the Boston Beaneaters

Last MLB appearance
- May 16, 1891, for the Boston Beaneaters

MLB statistics
- Batting average: .125
- Home runs: 0
- Runs batted in: 0
- Stats at Baseball Reference

Teams
- Boston Beaneaters (1891)

George Brinton McClellan Rooks (born George Brinton Mc Clellan Ruckser; October 21, 1863 – March 11, 1935), was an American Major League Baseball outfielder. He played for the Boston Beaneaters of the National League in five games during the 1891 baseball season.
