= Roy Beecher =

American baseball player (1884-1952)

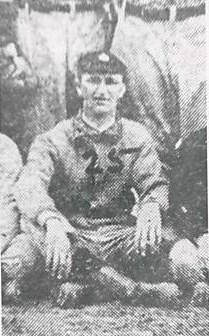
- Pitcher
- Born: May 10, 1884; Swanton, Ohio
- Died: October 11, 1952 (aged 68); Toledo, Ohio
- Batted: Left Threw: Right

MLB debut
- September 29, 1907, for the New York Giants

Last MLB appearance
- June 25, 1908, for the New York Giants

MLB statistics
- Win–loss record: 0–2
- Earned run average: 4.12
- Strikeouts: 5
- Stats at Baseball Reference

Teams
- New York Giants (1907–1908)

Leroy "Colonel" Beecher (May 10, 1884 – October 11, 1952) was a pitcher in Major League Baseball. He played for the New York Giants.
