= Pat Flaherty (baseball) =

American baseball player (1866–1946)

- Third baseman
- Born: January 31, 1866; St. Louis, Missouri, U.S.
- Died: January 28, 1946 (aged 79); Chicago, Illinois, U.S.
- Batted: Right Threw: Unknown

MLB debut
- July 11, 1894, for the Louisville Colonels

Last MLB appearance
- August 25, 1894, for the Louisville Colonels

MLB statistics
- Batting average: .287
- Home runs: 0
- RBI: 15
- Stats at Baseball Reference

Teams
- Louisville Colonels (1894)

Patrick Henry Flaherty (January 31, 1866 – January 28, 1946) was an American Major League Baseball third baseman who played with the Louisville Colonels in 1894. His minor league career stretched from 1887 though 1900, mostly in the Texas League and Western Association.
